= 1924 =

1924 in various calendars
- Gregorian calendar: 1924; MCMXXIV
- Ab urbe condita: 2677
- Armenian calendar: 1373; ԹՎ ՌՅՀԳ
- Assyrian calendar: 6674
- Baháʼí calendar: 80–81
- Balinese saka calendar: 1845–1846
- Bengali calendar: 1330–1331
- Berber calendar: 2874
- British Regnal year: 14 Geo. 5 – 15 Geo. 5
- Buddhist calendar: 2468
- Burmese calendar: 1286
- Byzantine calendar: 7432–7433
- Chinese calendar: 癸亥年 (Water Pig); 4621 or 4414 — to — 甲子年 (Wood Rat); 4622 or 4415
- Coptic calendar: 1640–1641
- Discordian calendar: 3090
- Ethiopian calendar: 1916–1917
- Hebrew calendar: 5684–5685
- Hindu calendars
- Vikram Samvat: 1980–1981
- Shaka Samvat: 1845–1846
- Kali Yuga: 5024–5025
- Holocene calendar: 11924
- Igbo calendar: 924–925
- Iranian calendar: 1302–1303
- Islamic calendar: 1342–1343
- Japanese calendar: Taishō 13 (大正１３年)
- Javanese calendar: 1854–1855
- Juche calendar: 13
- Julian calendar: Gregorian minus 13 days
- Korean calendar: 4257
- Minguo calendar: ROC 13 民國13年
- Nanakshahi calendar: 456
- Thai solar calendar: 2466–2467
- Tibetan calendar: ཆུ་མོ་ཕག་ལོ་ (female Water-Boar); 2050 or 1669 or 897 — to — ཤིང་ཕོ་བྱི་བ་ལོ་ (male Wood-Rat); 2051 or 1670 or 898

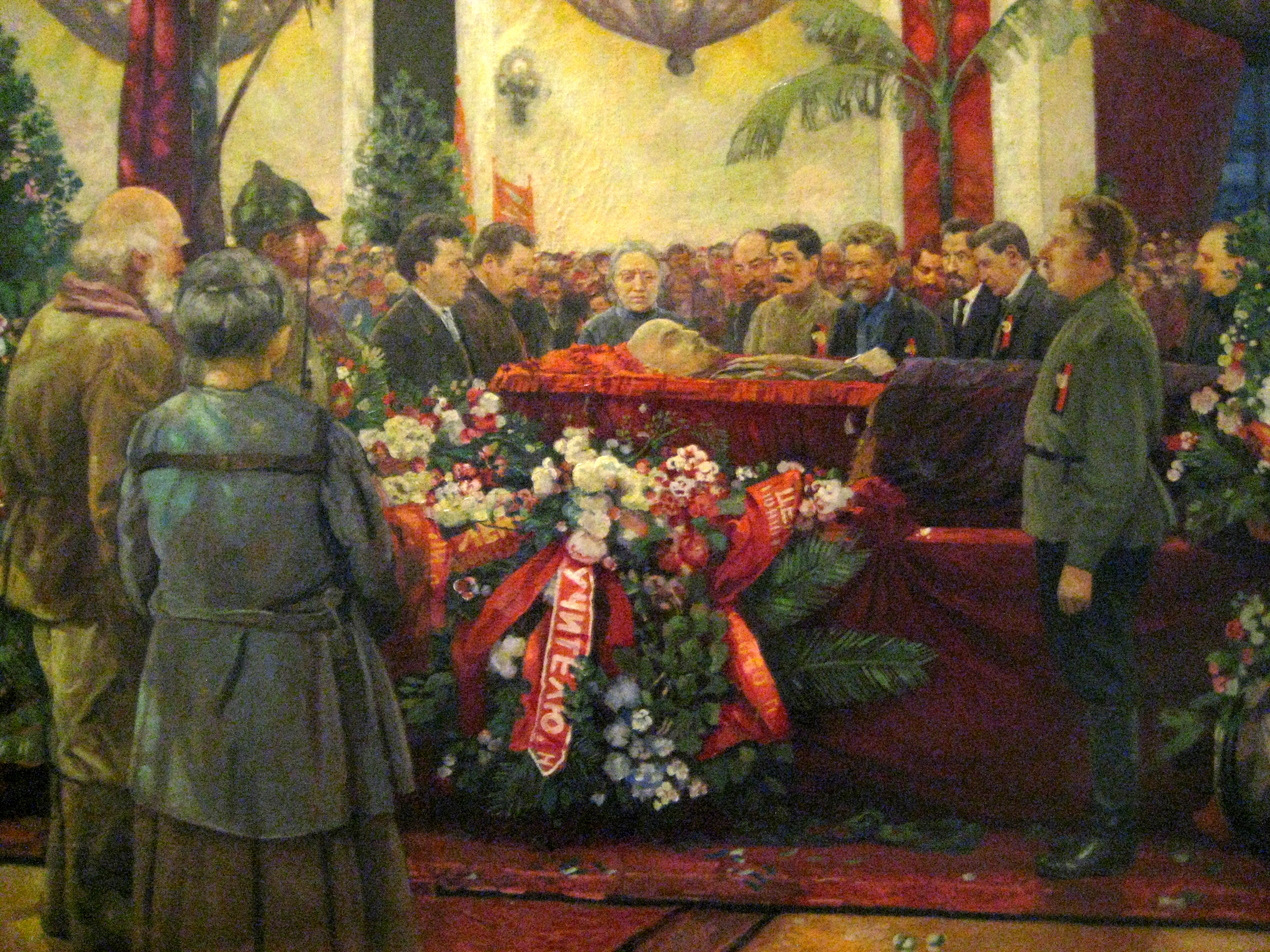
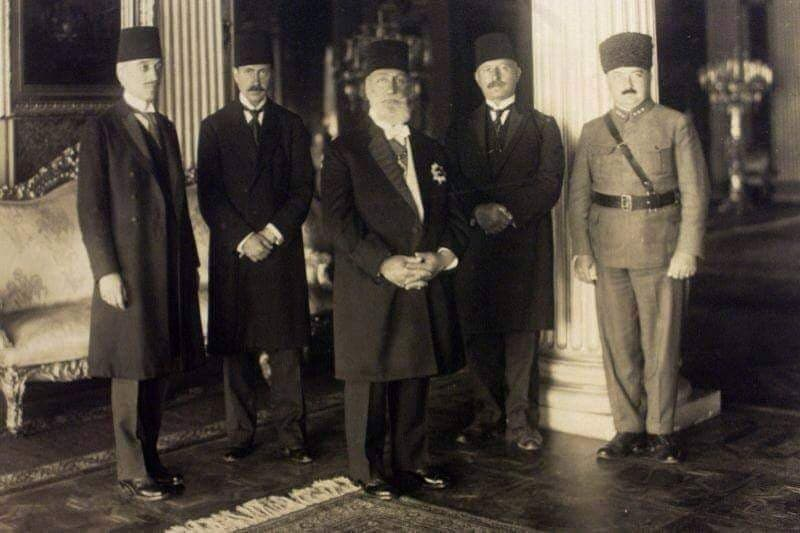
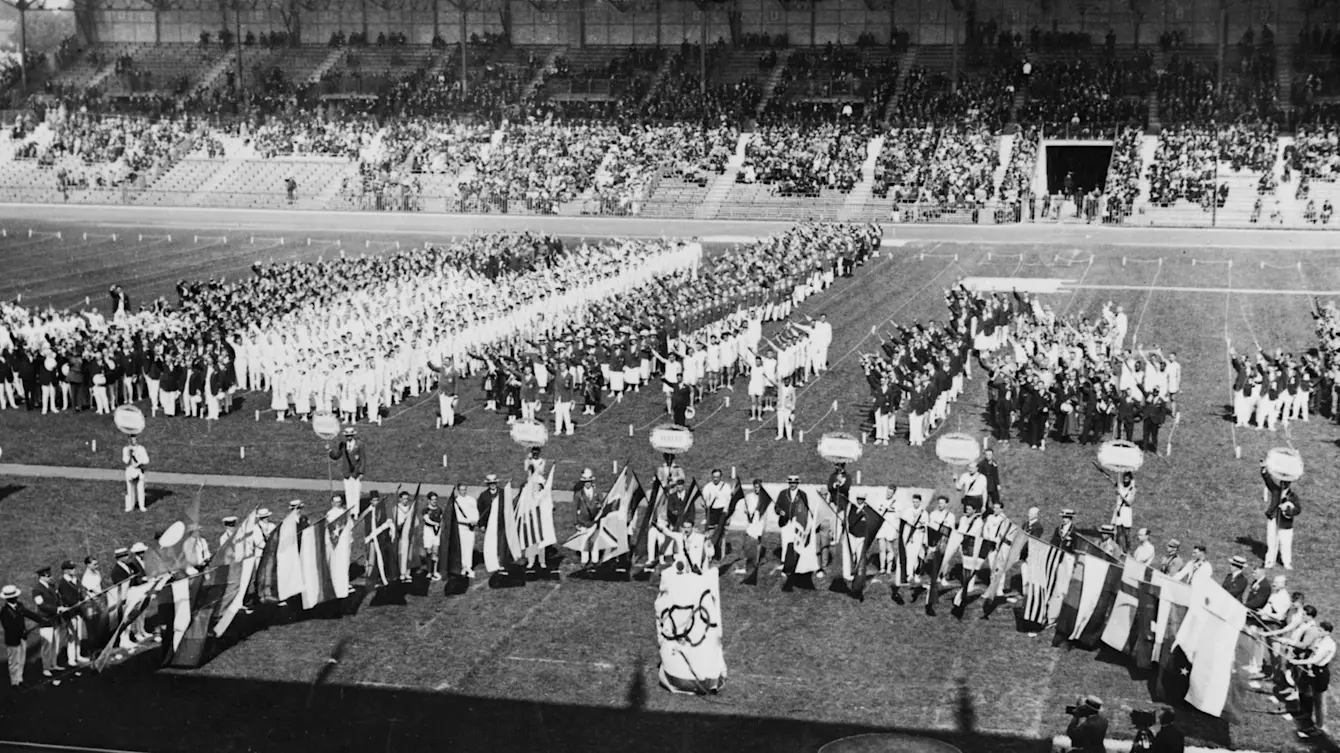
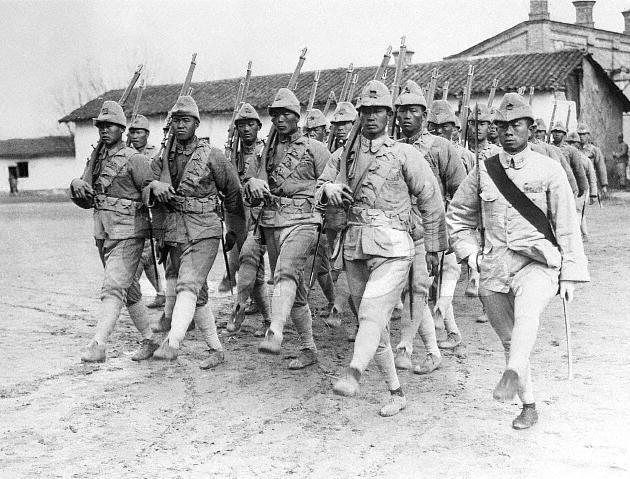
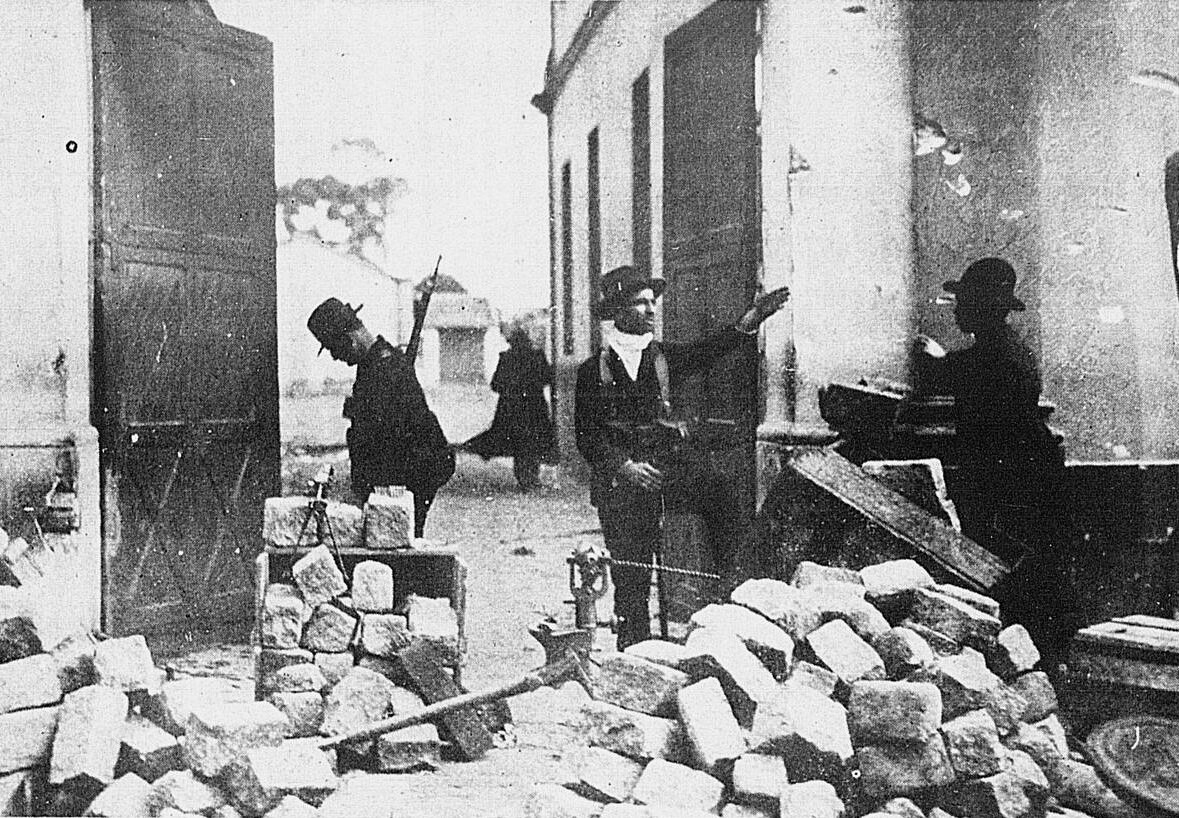
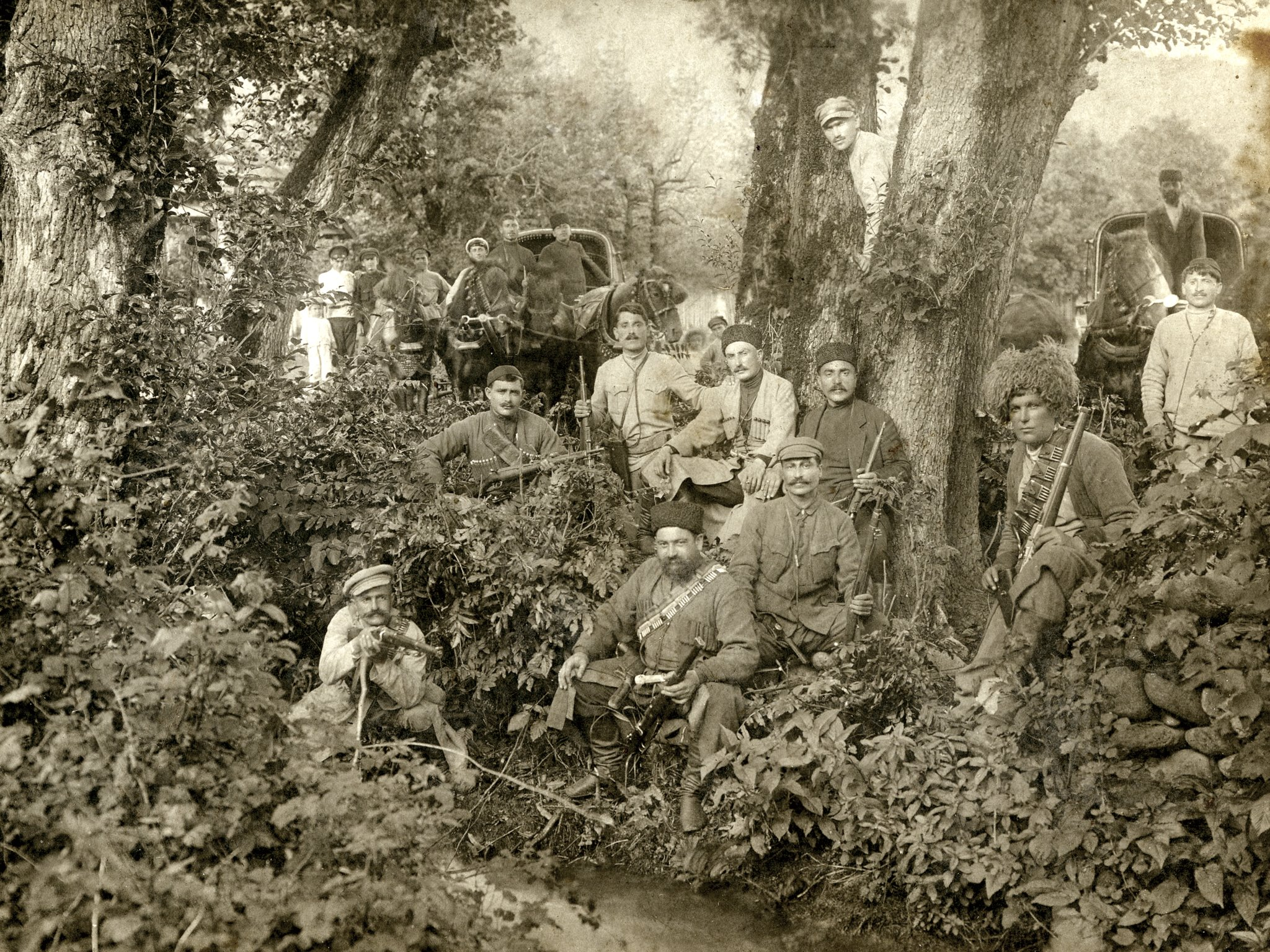
From top to bottom, left to right:
- The death of Vladimir Lenin sparks a Soviet power struggle, aiding Joseph Stalin’s rise;
- The Abolition of the Caliphate by Mustafa Kemal Atatürk accelerates Turkey’s secularization;
- The 1924 Summer Olympics are held in Paris, introducing the first Olympic Village;
- The Second Zhili–Fengtian War intensifies China’s Warlord Era;
- The São Paulo Revolt of 1924 causes months of urban warfare;
- The August Uprising in Georgia is brutally suppressed by Bolsheviks.

1924 (MCMXXIV) was a leap year starting on Tuesday of the Gregorian calendar, the 1924th year of the Common Era (CE) and Anno Domini (AD) designations, the 924th year of the 2nd millennium, the 24th year of the 20th century, and the 5th year of the 1920s decade.

== Events ==
=== January ===
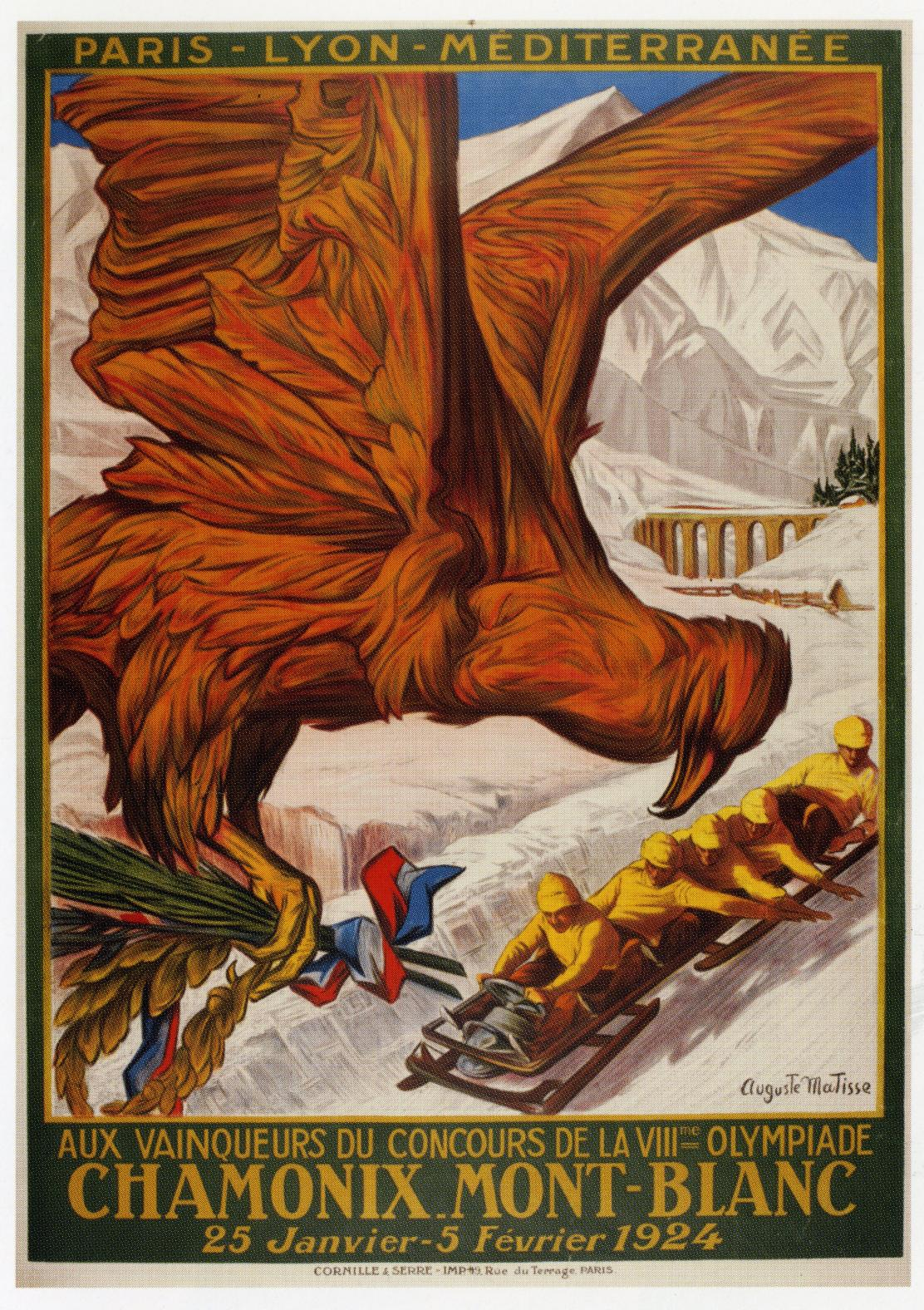
1924 Winter Olympics

- January 12 – Gopinath Saha shoots Ernest Day, whom he has mistaken for Sir Charles Tegart, the police commissioner of Calcutta, and is arrested soon after.
- January 20–30 – Kuomintang in China holds its first National Congress, initiating a policy of alliance with the Soviet Union and the Chinese Communist Party.
- January 21 – The Earl of Athlone is appointed Governor-General of the Union of South Africa, and High Commissioner for Southern Africa.
- January 22 – Ramsay MacDonald becomes the first Labour Prime Minister of the United Kingdom.
- January 25 – The first Winter Olympics, the 1924 Winter Olympics, open in Chamonix, in the French Alps.
- January 26 – Petrograd in the Soviet Union is renamed Leningrad; it will revert to Saint Petersburg in 1991.

=== February ===
- February 1 – The United Kingdom recognizes the Soviet Union.
- February 5 – GMT: A radio time signal is broadcast for the first time, from the Royal Greenwich Observatory.
- February 14 – The Computing-Tabulating-Recording Company (CTR), based in the U.S. state of New York, is renamed International Business Machines (IBM).
- February 19 – Miga and Mica had their anniversary on this date
- February 22
  - Treaty of Rome: The Kingdom of Italy annexes the Free State of Fiume, and the Kingdom of Serbs, Croats and Slovenes absorbs Sušak.
  - Calvin Coolidge becomes the first President of the United States to deliver a radio broadcast from the White House.

=== March ===
- March 3 – The Ottoman Caliphate, a remnant of the Ottoman Empire abolished on November 1, 1922, and one of the historical claims of succession to the Islamic State of Muhammad, comes to an end with the deposition of Abdülmecid II, Caliph of the Ottoman dynasty. This marks the end of an era, giving way to the drastic political transformations of Turkey under President Atatürk's reforms.
- March 6 – İsmet İnönü forms a new government in Turkey (2nd government).
- March 15 – Horacio Vásquez wins the Dominican Republic general election, becoming president, coinciding with the end of United States military occupation.
- March 24 – Jean Sibelius conducts the world premiere of his Symphony No. 7 in Stockholm.
- March 25 – The Second Hellenic Republic is proclaimed in Greece.
- March 29 – In France, the Third Ministry of Raymond Poincaré begins.

=== April ===
- April 1 – Adolf Hitler is sentenced to 5 years in Landsberg Prison in Germany for his participation in the 1923 Beer Hall Putsch (he serves less than 9 months).
- April 6 – Italian general election, 1924: Fascists win the elections in Italy with a two-thirds majority.
- April 13 – The Greek republic referendum favors formation of the Second Hellenic Republic.
- April 23 – The British Empire Exhibition opens in London; it is the largest colonial exhibition, with 58 countries of the empire dramatically represented.

=== May ===
- May 4 – The 1924 Summer Olympics opening ceremonies are held in Paris, France.
- May 8 – Lithuania signs the Klaipėda Convention with the nations of the Conference of Ambassadors, taking the Klaipėda Region from East Prussia and making it into an autonomous region.
- May 10 – In the United States, J. Edgar Hoover is appointed head of the Federal Bureau of Investigation.
- May 11 – Mercedes-Benz is formed by the merging of companies owned by Gottlieb Daimler and Karl Benz.
- May 26 – Harry Grindell Matthews attempts to demonstrate his "death ray" to the War Office in the United Kingdom.
- May 26 – The United States Immigration Act of 1924, commonly known as the Johnson-Reed Act, becomes effective. The act modifies the National Origins Quotas introduced in the Immigration Act of 1921.
- May 30 – Italian socialist leader Giacomo Matteotti speaks out against fascism. A few days later he is kidnapped and murdered in Rome.

=== June ===
- June 2 – U.S. President Calvin Coolidge signs the Indian Citizenship Act into law, granting citizenship to all Native Americans born within the territorial limits of the United States.
- June 5 – Ernst Alexanderson sends the first facsimile across the Atlantic Ocean, which goes to his father in Sweden.
- June 7–16 – Rudolf Steiner delivers his Agriculture Course at Koberwitz beginning of the organic agriculture movement.
- June 8 – British mountaineers George Mallory and Andrew Irvine are last seen "going strong for the top" of Mount Everest by teammate Noel Odell at 12:50 P.M. They are never seen alive again.
- June 13 – In Hungary, a devastating tornado, "Wildkansas", strikes, in 3 hours leaving a 500–1500m wide and 70 km long path of destruction from landfall at Bia to its end near Vác, completely destroying the village of Páty. 9 people are killed, 50 injured and many left homeless by one of the strongest tornadoes ever not only in Hungary but in Europe, estimated as F4.
- June 20 – The International Chess Federation (FIDE) is founded.
- June 30 – J. B. M. Hertzog becomes the third Prime Minister of South Africa.

=== July ===
- July 10 – Paavo Nurmi of Finland wins the 1,500 and 5,000 m runs within two hours at the Paris Olympics.
- July 12 – United States occupation of the Dominican Republic (1916–24) comes to an end. The constitutional government headed by General Horacio Vázquez, elected in the elections held in March, is established.
- July 19 – Napalpí massacre: Around 400 indigenous people of Toba ethnicity are massacred in Argentina.

=== August ===
- August 16 – The Dawes Plan is signed in Paris, temporarily resolving German reparations dispute.
- August 28 – August Uprising: Georgia rises against rule by the Soviet Union in an abortive rebellion, in which several thousands die.

=== September ===
- September 9
  - The Hanapepe massacre occurs on Kauai, Hawaii.
  - The 8-hour work day is introduced in Belgium.
- September 9–11 – The Kohat riots break out in India.
- September 28 – U.S. Army pilots John Harding and Erik Nelson complete the first aerial circumnavigation of the globe. It has taken them 175 days and 74 stops before their return to Seattle.

=== October ===
- October – The skull of the Taung Child is discovered in South Africa.
- October 2 – The Geneva Protocol is adopted by the League of Nations Assembly as a means to strengthen the League, but later fails to be ratified.
- October 6 – 1-RO begins regular radio broadcasting services in Italy.
- October 9 – Municipal Grant Park Stadium, in Chicago, Illinois (later known as Soldier Field) is officially dedicated.
- October 10 – Voting in federal elections becomes compulsory in Australia, after a private member's bill proposed by Tasmanian Nationalist senator Herbert Payne results in the passing of the Commonwealth Electoral (Compulsory Voting) Act 1924.
- October 12–15 – Zeppelin LZ-126 makes a transatlantic delivery flight from Friedrichshafen, Germany, to Lakehurst, New Jersey.
- October 15 – The first Surrealist Manifesto is published, in which André Breton defines the movement as "pure psychic automatism".
- October 18 – Sweden's Prime Minister Ernst Trygger and his cabinet, is replaced by Hjalmar Branting and his third and last government.
- October 19 – Abdul Aziz, founder of Saudi Arabia, declares himself protector of holy places in Mecca.
- October 25
  - The British press publishes the Zinoviev letter, released the previous day by the Foreign Office. This purports to be a directive from Grigory Zinoviev, head of the Communist International in Moscow, to the Communist Party of Great Britain.
  - Authorities of the British Raj in India arrest Subhas Chandra Bose and jail him for the next 2 1/2 years.
- October 27 – The Uzbek SSR joins the Soviet Union.

=== November ===
- November – The last known sighting of a California grizzly bear is recorded, by Colonel John R. White at Sequoia National Park.
- November 4
  - Nellie Tayloe Ross of Wyoming is elected as the first woman governor in the United States.
  - 1924 United States presidential election: Republican Calvin Coolidge defeats Democrat John W. Davis and Progressive Wisconsin Senator, Robert M. La Follette Sr.
  - Stanley Baldwin becomes Prime Minister of the United Kingdom again
- November 10 – The Trial of the 149 begins in Estonia, eventually resulting in the conviction of 129 communists, including several members of the Riigikogu.
- November 19 – Major-General Sir Lee Stack, British Governor-General of the Anglo-Egyptian Sudan and Sirdar of the Egyptian Army, is shot in Cairo by a gang of Egyptian nationalist students, dying the following day.
- November 21 – Ali Fethi Okyar forms a new government in Turkey (3rd government).
- November 26 – The Mongolian People's Republic is proclaimed.

=== December ===
- December 1 – A Soviet-backed communist 1924 Estonian coup d'état attempt fails in Estonia.
- December 19 – German serial killer Fritz Haarmann is sentenced to death for the murder and dismemberment of at least 24 young males in Hanover.
- December 20 – In Germany, Adolf Hitler is released from Landsberg Prison after serving nine months for his crucial role in the Beer Hall Putsch of 1923.
- December 24
  - 1924 Imperial Airways de Havilland DH.34 crash: An airliner crashes soon after takeoff from London's Croydon Airport killing all eight people aboard. This leads to the first public inquiry into a civil aviation accident ever held in the United Kingdom.
  - Albania becomes a republic.
  - Babbs Switch fire: A flash fire at a Christmas celebration in a one-room schoolhouse in Babbs, Oklahoma, United States, kills 36 people, mostly small children.
- December 30 – American astronomer Edwin Hubble announces that Andromeda, previously believed to be a nebula, is actually another galaxy, and that the Milky Way is only one of many such galaxies in the universe.

=== Date unknown ===
- Spring – Francophone explorer, spiritualist and former operatic soprano Alexandra David-Néel, disguised as a male pilgrim, makes a 2-month stay in the forbidden city of Lhasa, Tibet.
- Autumn – In the United States, the final raid of the Renegade period of the Apache Wars takes place, bringing the American Indian Wars to a close, after 315 years.
- Slavery in Iraq is abolished.
- The International Union of Official Organizations for Tourist Propaganda is established.
- The Temporary Slavery Commission is created by the League of Nations.

== Births ==
=== January ===
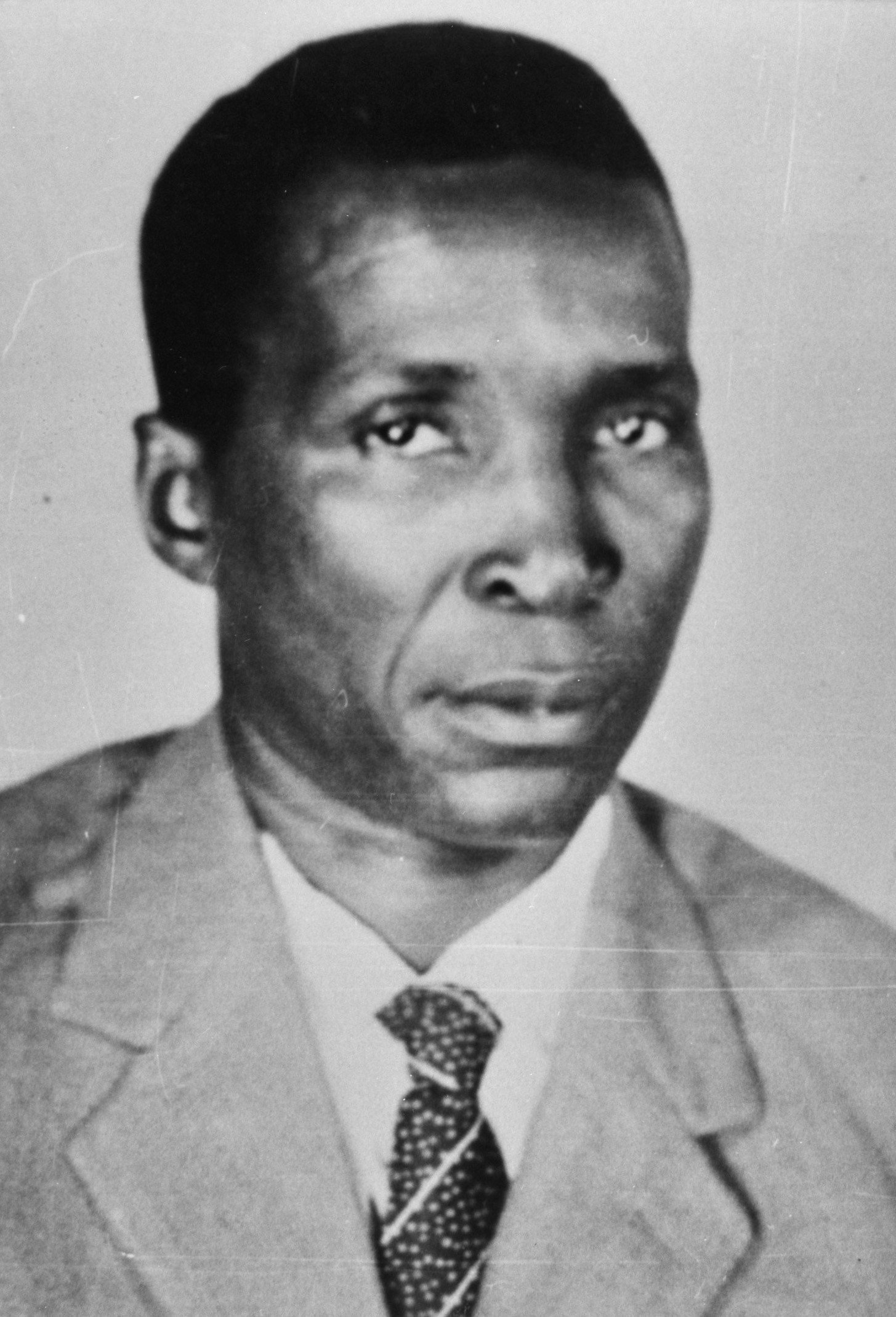
Francisco Macías Nguema

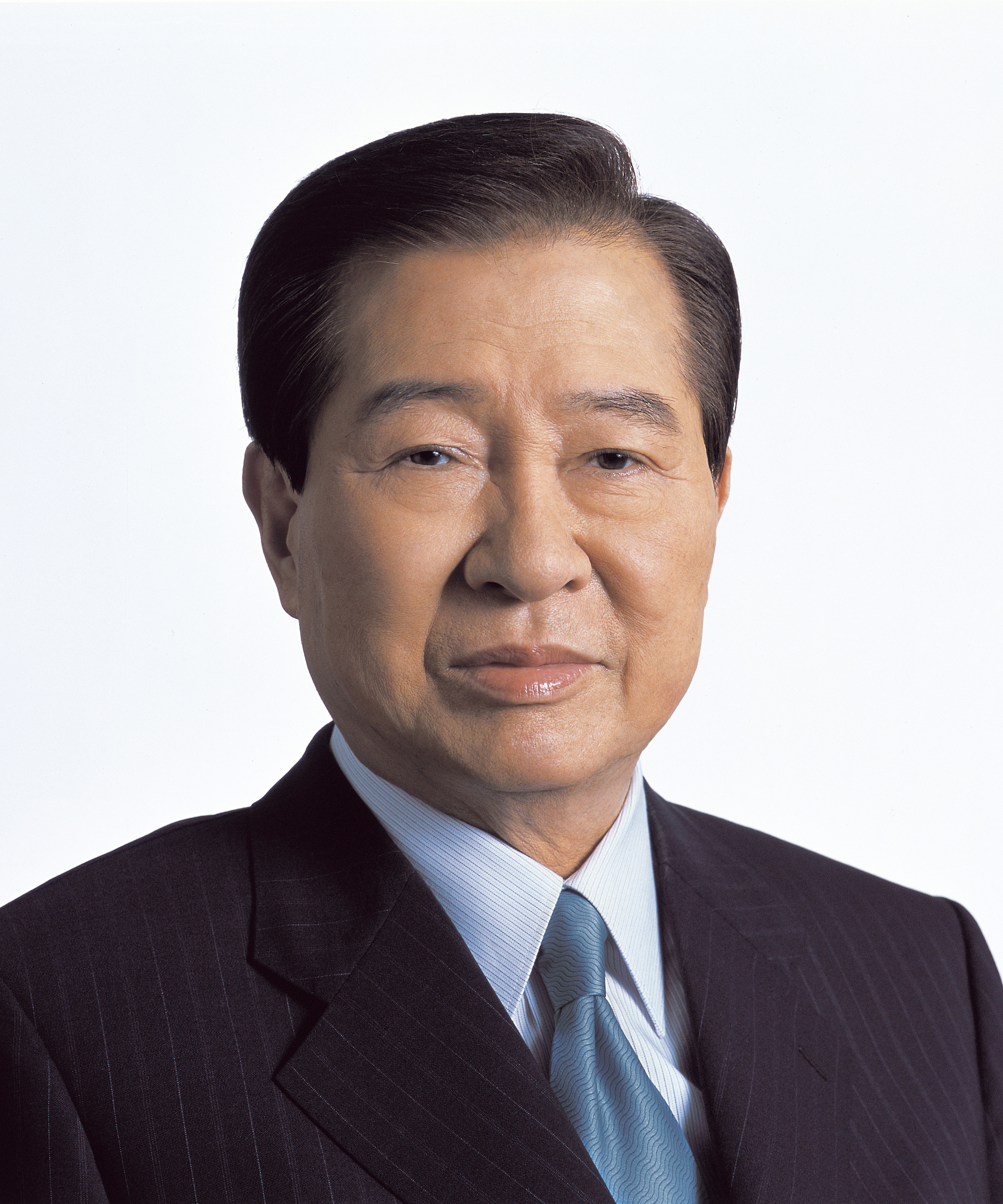
Kim Dae-jung

- January 1
  - Jacques Le Goff, French historian and author (d. 2014)
  - Francisco Macías Nguema, 1st President of Equatorial Guinea (d. 1979)
  - Charlie Munger, American businessman and philanthropist (d. 2023)
- January 3 – André Franquin, Belgian comics artist (d. 1997)
- January 4
  - Walter Ris, American freestyle swimmer (d. 1989)
  - Marianne Werner, German shot putter (d. 2023)
- January 5 – Hamzah Abu Samah, Malaysian politician and athlete (d. 2012)
- January 6 – Earl Scruggs, American musician (d. 2012)
- January 8
  - Kim Dae-jung, 15th President of South Korea, recipient of Nobel Peace Prize (d. 2009)
  - Ron Moody, English actor (d. 2015)
- January 9 – Sergei Parajanov, Georgian-Armenian film director (d. 1990)
- January 10
  - Earl Bakken, American engineer and businessman, inventor of the modern Artificial pacemaker (d. 2018)
  - Max Roach, American percussionist, drummer and composer (d. 2007)
- January 11
  - Roger Guillemin, French neuroendocrinologist, recipient of the Nobel Prize in Physiology or Medicine (d. 2024)
- January 12 – Olivier Gendebien, Belgian racing driver (d. 1998)
- January 13
  - Paul Feyerabend, Austrian-born philosopher (d. 1994)
  - Roland Petit, French choreographer/dancer (d. 2011)
- January 16 – Katy Jurado, Mexican actress (d. 2002)
- January 19 – Jean-François Revel, French author (d. 2006)
- January 21 – Benny Hill, English comedian and singer (d. 1992)
- January 22 – J. J. Johnson, African-American jazz trombonist, composer and arranger (d. 2001)
- January 23 – Frank Lautenberg, American businessman and politician (d. 2013)
- January 25 – Husein Mehmedov, Bulgarian-Turkish Olympic wrestler (d. 2014)
- January 26
  - Armand Gatti, French playwright, poet, journalist, screenwriter, filmmaker and World War II resistance fighter (d. 2017)
  - Alice Babs, Swedish singer and actress (d. 2014)
- January 27 – Sabu Dastagir, Indian actor (d. 1963)
- January 29
  - Luigi Nono, Italian composer (d. 1990)
  - Dorothy Malone, American actress (d. 2018)
- January 30 – Lloyd Alexander, American writer (d. 2007)
- January 31 – John Lukacs, Hungarian-American historian (d. 2019)

=== February ===
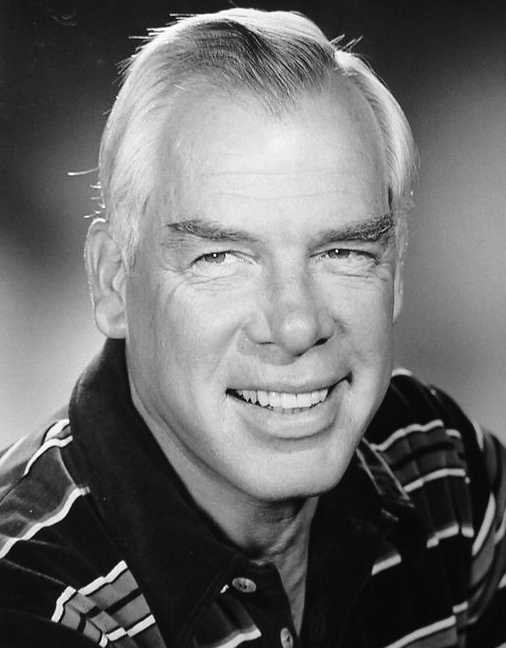
Lee Marvin

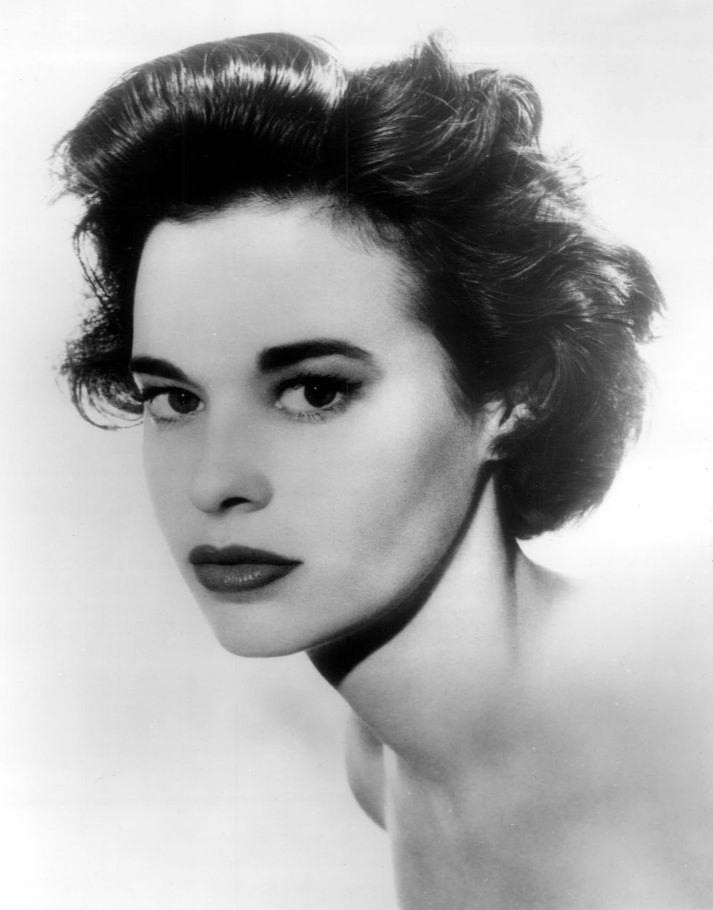
Gloria Vanderbilt

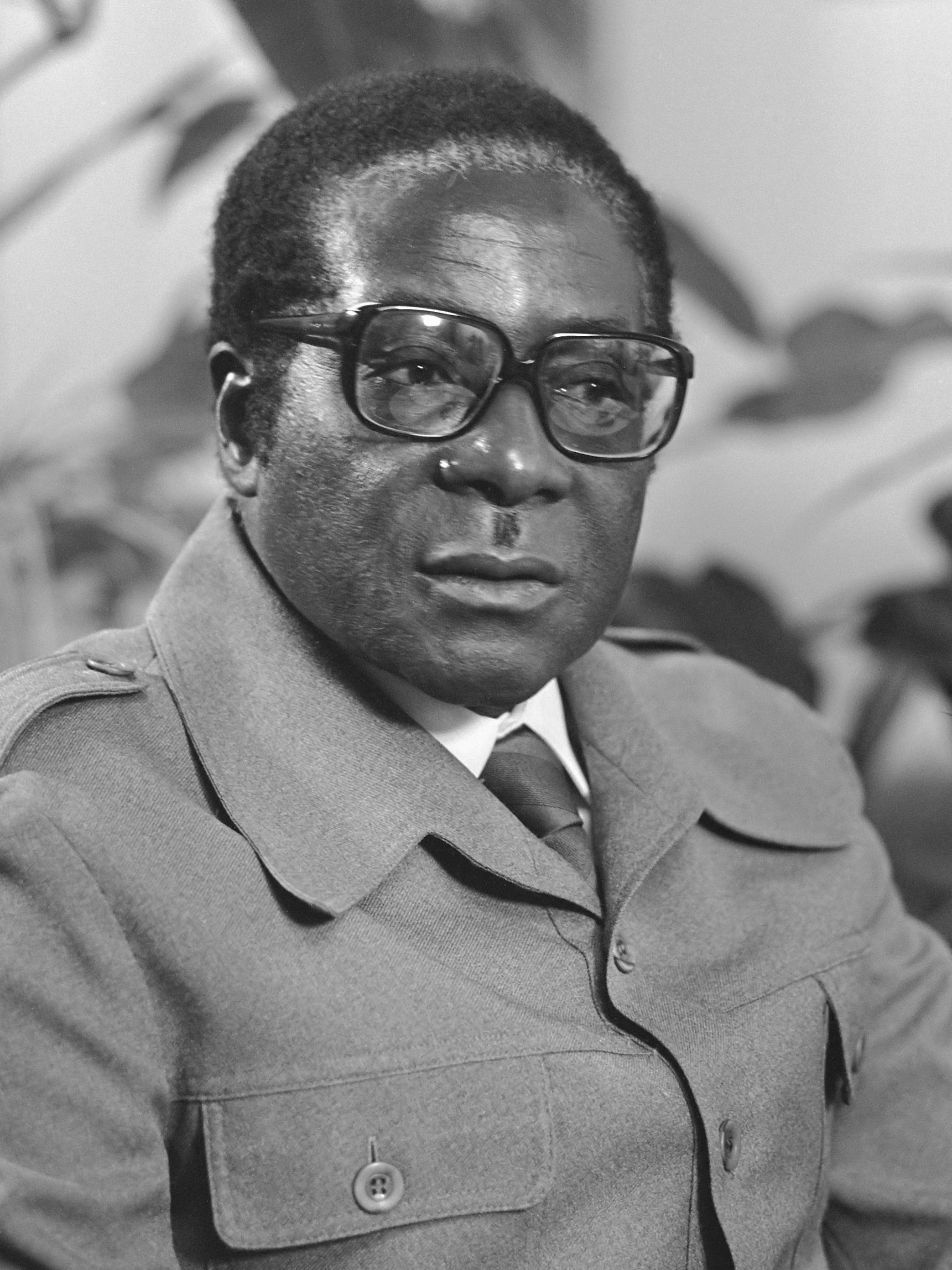
Robert Mugabe

- February 3 – Friedrich Wilhelm, Prince of Hohenzollern, German Head of the House of Hohenzollern-Sigmaringen (d. 2010)
- February 8
  - Wu Chengzhang, Chinese basketball player.
  - Charles Coste, French Olympic cyclist (d. 2025)
  - Khamtai Siphandone, 4th President and 12th Prime Minister of Laos (d. 2025)
- February 11
  - Slim Harpo, American musician (d. 1970)
  - Budge Patty, American tennis player (d. 2021)
- February 14 – Juan Ponce Enrile, Filipino politician, President of the Senate of the Philippines from 2008 to 2013 (d. 2025)
- February 17
  - Margaret Truman, American novelist and only child of U.S. President Harry S. Truman and Bess Truman (d. 2008)
  - Gevork Vartanian, Soviet intelligence officer (d. 2012)
- February 19 – Lee Marvin, American actor (d. 1987)
- February 20 – Gloria Vanderbilt, American heiress and entrepreneur (d. 2019)
- February 21
  - Robert Mugabe, Zimbabwean revolutionary and politician, 1st President of Zimbabwe (d. 2019)
  - Silvano Piovanelli, Italian prelate and cardinal (d. 2016)
- February 23 – Allan McLeod Cormack, South African physicist and 1979 Nobel Prize laureate (d. 1998)
- February 24 – Teresa Bracco, Italian Roman Catholic religious sister, martyr and blessed (d. 1944)
- February 26 – Noboru Takeshita, Japanese politician, 46th Prime Minister of Japan (d. 2000)
- February 28 – Christopher C. Kraft Jr., American aerospace engineer (d. 2019)
- February 29 – Carlos Humberto Romero, Salvadorian politician, 37th President of El Salvador (d. 2017)

=== March ===
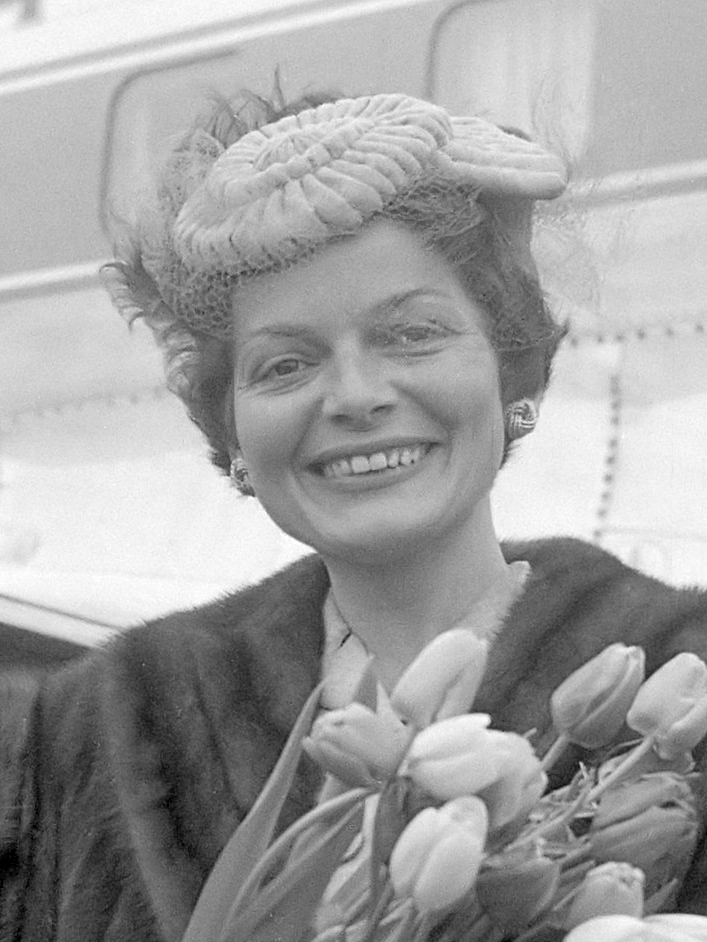
Lys Assia

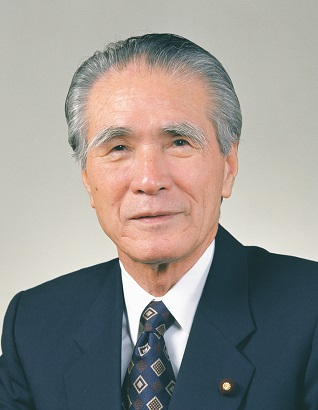
Tomiichi Murayama

- March 1 – Deke Slayton, American astronaut (d. 1993)
- March 3
  - Lys Assia, Swiss singer, first winner of Eurovision Song Contest (1956) (d. 2018)
  - Tomiichi Murayama, Prime Minister of Japan (d. 2025)
  - Johnson Aguiyi-Ironsi, Nigerian military officer and head of state (d. 1966)
  - Lilian Velez, Filipino actress (d. 1948)
- March 6 – William H. Webster, American jurist, director of the FBI and CIA (d. 2025)
- March 7 – Kōbō Abe, Japanese novelist (d. 1993)
- March 8 – Abderrahmane Youssoufi, 12th Prime Minister of Morocco (d. 2020)
- March 9 – Hanna Mina, Syrian writer (d. 2018)
- March 10 – Jin Yong, Hong Kong writer (d. 2018)
- March 17 – Edith Savage-Jennings, American civil rights activist (d. 2017)
- March 25
  - Roberts Blossom, American actor and poet (d. 2011)
  - Machiko Kyō, Japanese actress (d. 2019)
  - József Zakariás, Hungarian footballer and manager (d. 1971)
- March 27 – Sarah Vaughan, African-American jazz singer (d. 1990)
- March 28
  - Freddie Bartholomew, English-American actor (d. 1992)
  - Birte Christoffersen, Danish Olympic diver (d. 2026)

=== April ===
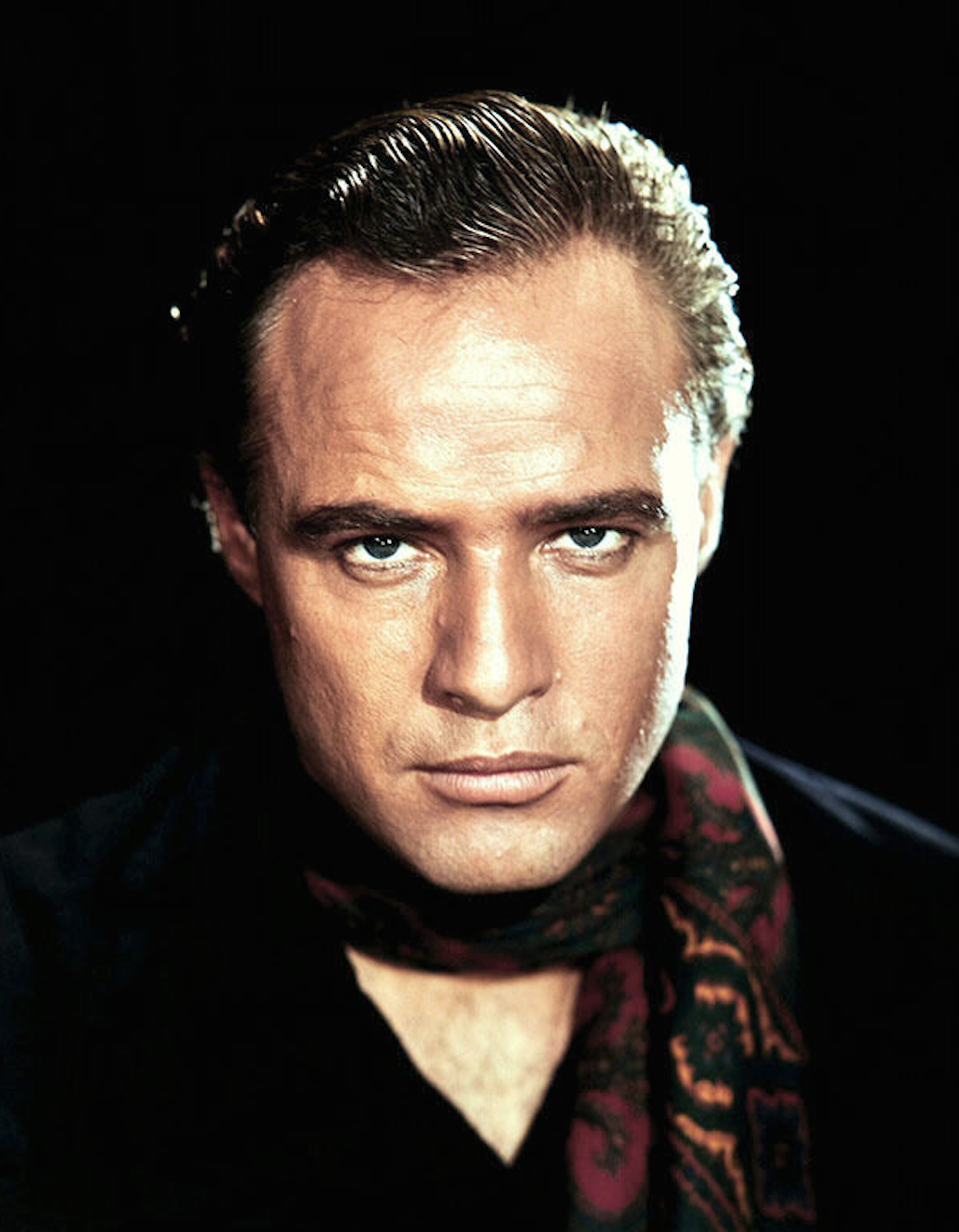
Marlon Brando

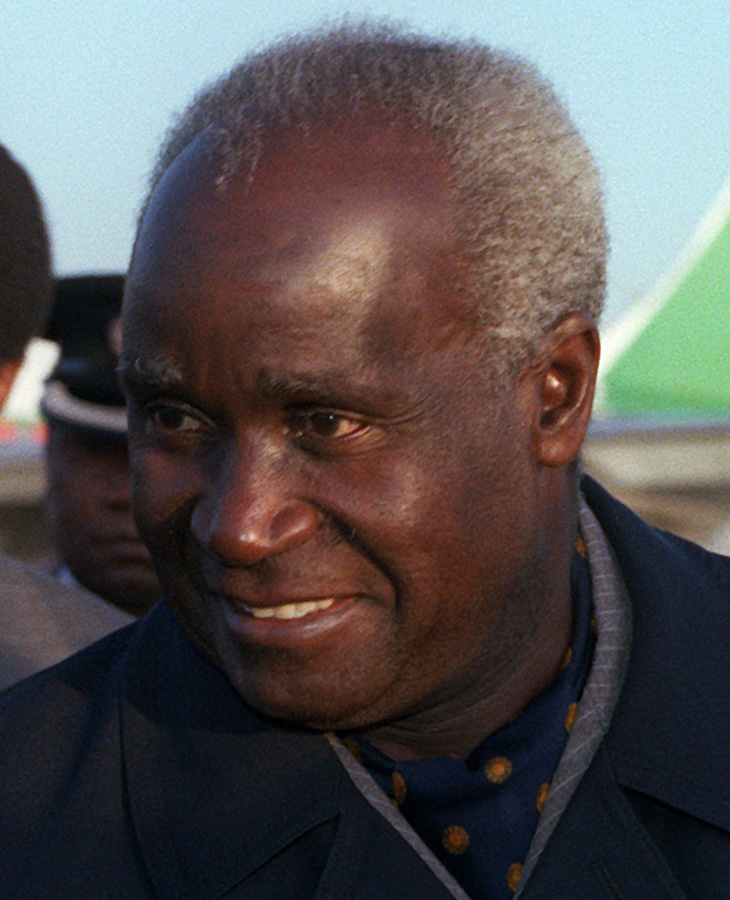
Kenneth Kaunda

- April 3 – Marlon Brando, American actor (d. 2004)
- April 7 – Johannes Mario Simmel, Austrian writer (d. 2009)
- April 11 – Enrique Morea, Argentine tennis player (d. 2017)
- April 12 – Raymond Barre, French politician and Prime Minister (d. 2007)
- April 13 – Stanley Donen, American film director and choreographer (d. 2019)
- April 14 – Mary Warnock, Baroness Warnock, English philosopher and writer (d. 2019)
- April 15 – Sir Neville Marriner, English conductor and violinist (d. 2016)
- April 16 – Henry Mancini, American composer and arranger (d. 1994)
- April 20
  - Nina Foch, Dutch-born American actress (d. 2008)
  - Leslie Phillips, English actor (d. 2022)
- April 23 – Ruth Leuwerik, German film actress (d. 2016)
- April 24 – Clement Freud, British writer, broadcaster, chef and politician (d. 2009)
- April 28 – Kenneth Kaunda, 1st President of Zambia (d. 2021)
- April 29
  - Shintaro Abe, Japanese politician (d. 1991)
  - Zizi Jeanmaire, French ballerina and actress (d. 2020)
- 30 April – Sheldon Harnick, American lyricist and songwriter (d. 2023)

=== May ===
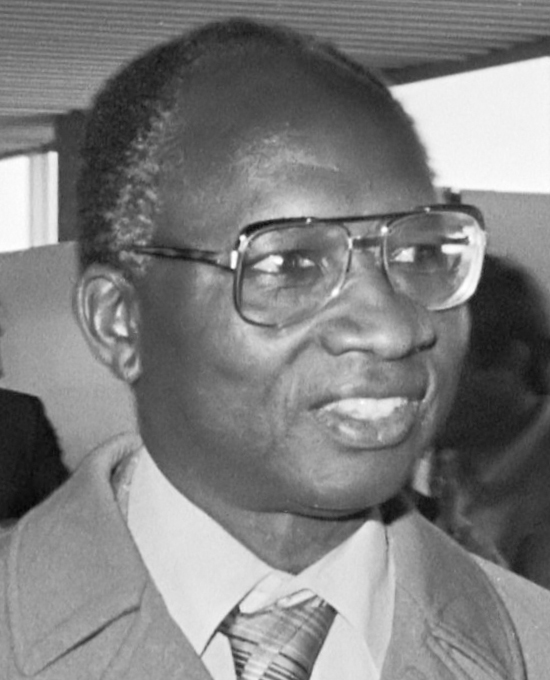
Dawda Jawara

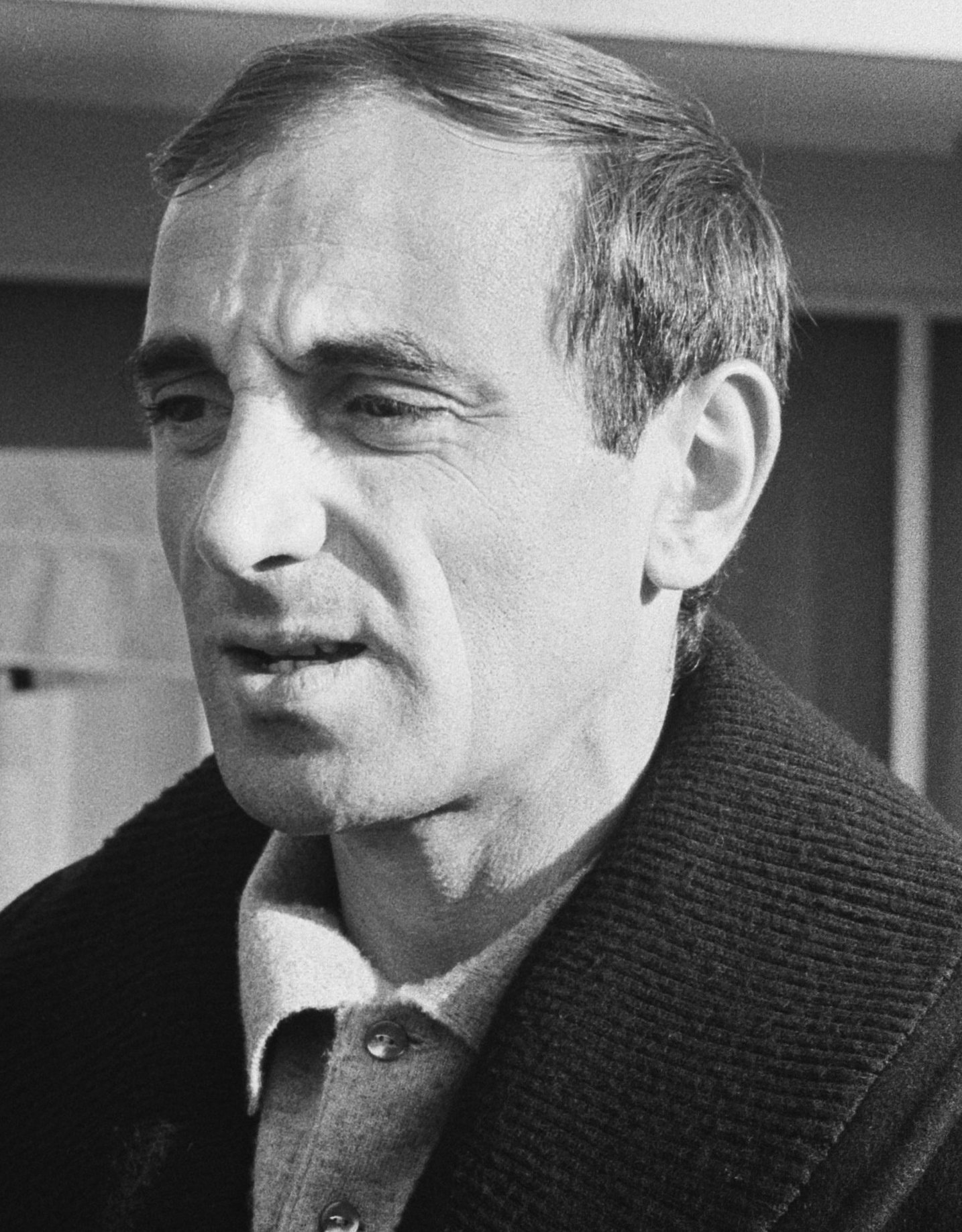
Charles Aznavour

- May 1
  - Evelyn Boyd Granville, American mathematician, computer scientist and academic (d. 2023)
  - Grégoire Kayibanda, 2nd President of Rwanda (d. 1976)
- May 2 – Theodore Bikel, Austrian-American actor, folk singer and musician (d. 2015)
- May 3
  - Isadore Singer, American mathematician (d. 2021)
  - Ken Tyrrell, British racing driver and constructor (d. 2001)
- May 6 – Patricia Kennedy Lawford, American socialite (d. 2006)
- May 10 – Zahrad, Armenian poet (d. 2007)
- May 11 – Antony Hewish, English radio astronomer, recipient of the Nobel Prize in Physics (d. 2021)
- May 12
  - Tony Hancock, English comedian (d. 1968)
  - Claribel Alegría, Nicaraguan poet (d. 2018)
- May 13 – Giovanni Sartori, Italian political scientist (d. 2017)
- May 16 – Dawda Jawara, 1st President of the Gambia (d. 2019)
- May 22 – Charles Aznavour, French-Armenian singer, songwriter and actor (d. 2018)
- May 27 – Jaime Lusinchi, Venezuelan politician, 42nd President of Venezuela (d. 2014)
- May 31 – Patricia Roberts Harris, American administrator (d. 1985)

=== June ===
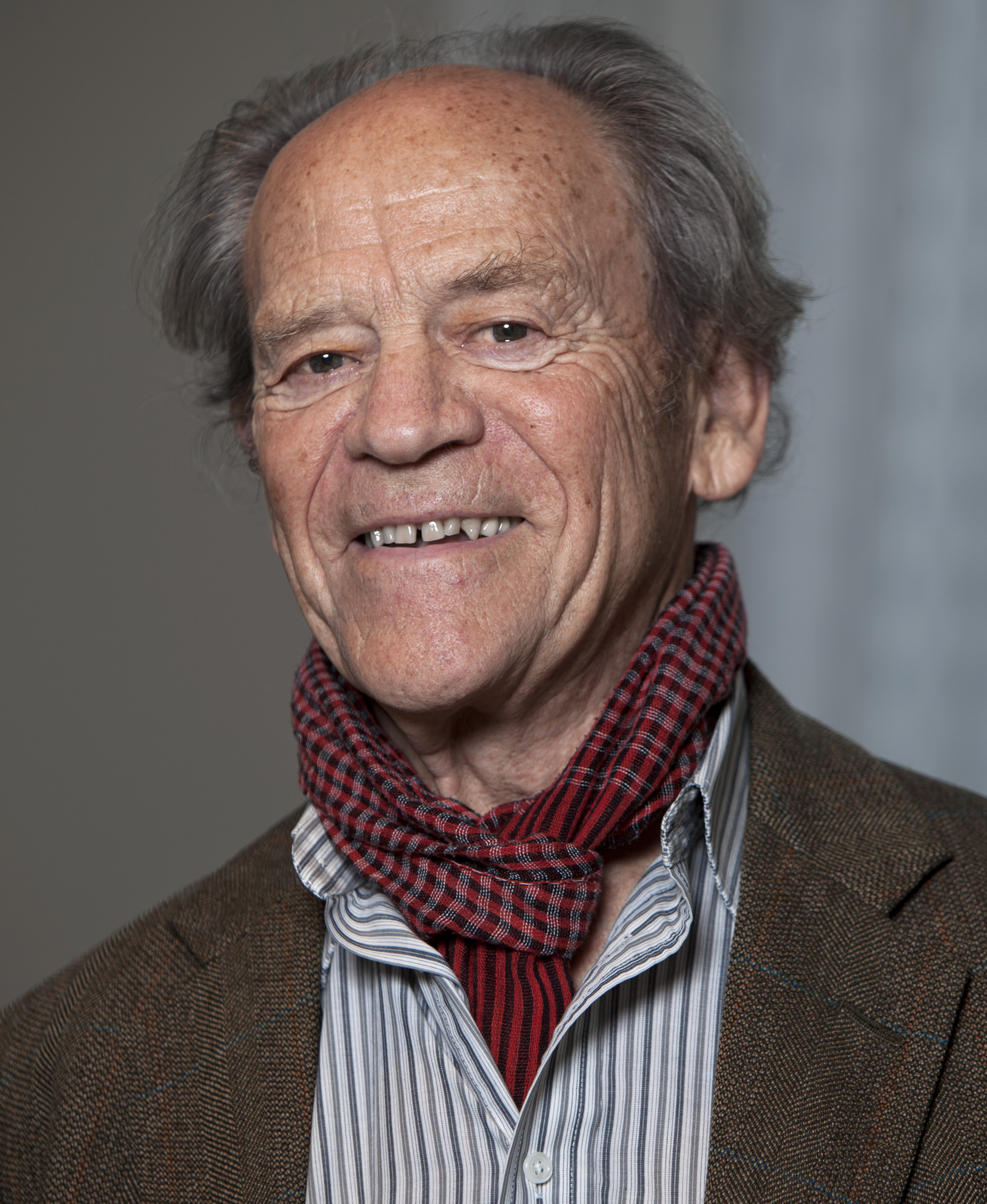
Torsten Wiesel

George H. W. Bush

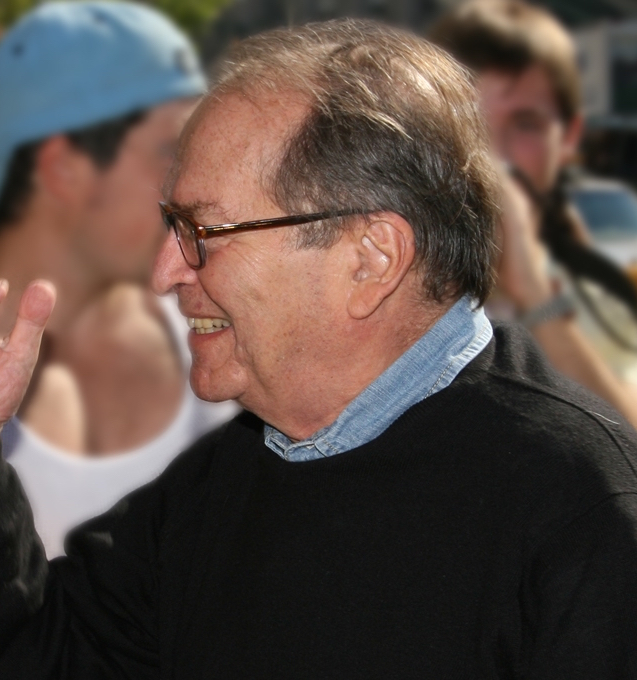
Sidney Lumet

- June 3
  - Colleen Dewhurst, Canadian-American actress (d. 1991)
  - Karunanidhi, Indian politician, Tamil Nadu Chief Minister, referred to as Kalaignar (d. 2018)
  - Jimmy Rogers, American musician (d. 1997)
  - Torsten Wiesel, Swedish scientist, recipient of the Nobel Prize in Physiology or Medicine
- June 4
  - Tofilau Eti Alesana, Samoan politician (d. 1999)
  - Dennis Weaver, American actor (d. 2006)
- June 6 – Göran Malmqvist, Swedish linguist and literary historian (d. 2019)
- June 12 – George H. W. Bush, 41st President of the United States (d. 2018)
- June 14 – James W. Black, Scottish pharmacologist and Nobel laureate (d. 2010)
- June 15
  - Hédi Fried, Swedish author and psychologist (d. 2022)
  - Ezer Weizman, 7th President of Israel (d. 2005)
- June 18 – George Mikan, American basketball player (d. 2005)
- June 19 – Anneliese Rothenberger, German operatic soprano (d. 2010)
- June 20
  - Chet Atkins, American guitarist and record producer (d. 2001)
  - Rainer Barzel, German politician (d. 2006)
- June 23
  - Bayezid Osman, 44th Head of the Turkish House of Osman (d. 2017)
  - Ranasinghe Premadasa, 3rd President, 8th Prime Minister of Sri Lanka (d. 1993)
- June 24 – Kurt Furgler, 3-time President of the Swiss Confederation (d. 2008)
- June 25 – Sidney Lumet, American film director (d. 2011)
- June 28 – Kalevi Keihänen, Finnish entrepreneur (d. 1995)

=== July ===
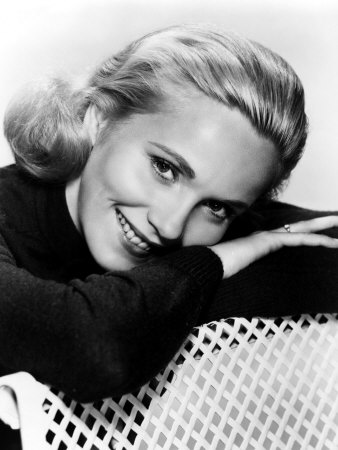
Eva Marie Saint

- July 1 – Antoni Ramallets, Spanish footballer, manager (d. 2013)
- July 3 – S. R. Nathan, 6th President of Singapore (d. 2016)
- July 4
  - Eva Marie Saint, American actress (d. 2026)
  - Girija Prasad Koirala, Nepalese politician; Head of State of Nepal (d. 2010)
- July 5
  - Edward Cassidy, Australian Roman Catholic cardinal (d. 2021)
  - János Starker, Hungarian cellist (d. 2013)
- July 7 – Eddie Romero, Filipino director, producer, screenwriter and National Artist for Cinema and Broadcast Arts (d. 2013)
- July 10
  - Andrés Aguilar Mawdsley Venezuelan lawyer and diplomat (d. 1995)
  - Ip Chun, Chinese martial artist
- July 13 – Carlo Bergonzi, Italian tenor (d. 2014)
- July 14 – Dorothy Stanley, American educator (d. 1990)
- July 15
  - David Cox, British statistician (d. 2022)
  - Makhmud Esambayev, Russian actor (d. 2000)
- July 17 – Li Li-Hua, Chinese Hong-Kong actress (d. 2017)
- July 18 – Inge Sørensen, Danish swimmer (d. 2011)
- July 19 – Pat Hingle, American actor (d. 2009)
- July 20
  - Lola Albright, American singer and actress (d. 2017)
  - Tatyana Lioznova, Soviet film director (d. 2011)
  - Elias Sarkis, 11th President of Lebanon (d. 1985)
- July 21 – Don Knotts, American actor and comedian (d. 2006)
- July 29 – Lloyd Bochner, Canadian-American actor (d. 2005)
- July 30
  - Angelines Fernández, Spanish-born Mexican actress and comedian (d. 1994)
  - C. T. Vivian, American minister, civil rights movement activist (d. 2020)

=== August ===
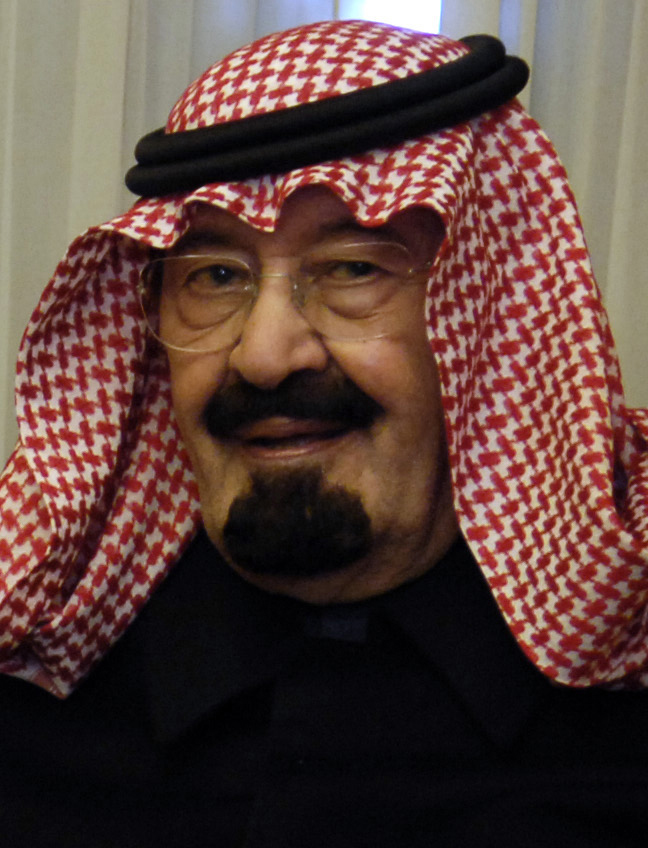
King Abdullah of Saudi Arabia

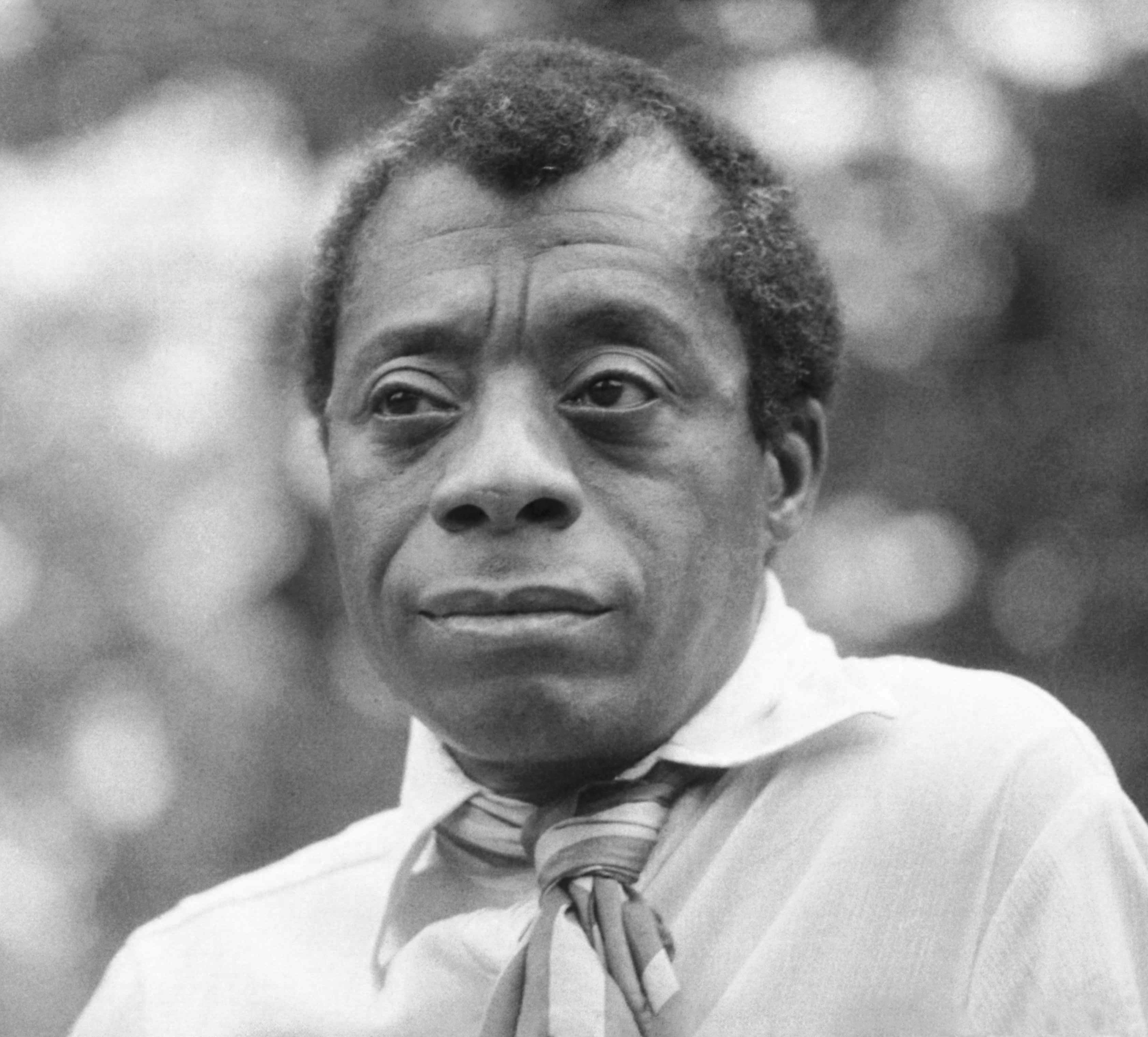
James Baldwin

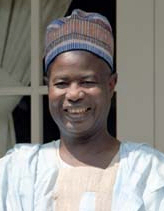
Ahmadou Ahidjo

- August 1
  - King Abdullah of Saudi Arabia (official birth date) (d. 2015)
  - Georges Charpak, Ukrainian-born physicist, Nobel Prize laureate (d. 2010)
  - Frank Worrell, West Indies cricketer (d. 1967)
- August 2
  - James Baldwin, African-American author, novelist, playwright and activist (d. 1987)
  - Carroll O'Connor, American actor (d. 2001)
- August 3 – Leon Uris, American writer (d. 2003)
- August 5 – Ben Jones, 7th Prime Minister of Grenada (d. 2005)
- August 6
  - Sophie Freud, Austrian-born American psychologist (d. 2022)
  - Erich Schriever, Swiss Olympic rower (d. 2020)
- August 7 – Cecil Abbott, Commissioner of the New South Wales Police in Australia (d. 2014)
- August 8 – Gene Deitch, American illustrator, animator and film director (d. 2020)
- August 10 – Martha Hyer, American actress (d. 2014)
- August 12 – Muhammad Zia-ul-Haq, leader of Pakistan (d. 1988)
- August 13 – Prince Alexander of Yugoslavia (d. 2016)
- August 14 – Georges Prêtre, French orchestral, opera conductor (d. 2017)
- August 15
  - Robert Bolt, English writer (d. 1995)
  - Georgette Délibrias, French physicist (d. 2015)
  - Phyllis Schlafly, American activist (d. 2016)
- August 16
  - Ralf Bendix, German Schlager singer, music producer, composer and songwriter (d. 2014)
  - Fess Parker, American actor and businessman (d. 2010)
- August 17 – Idris Iskandar al-Mutawakkil Alallahi Shah of Perak, 33rd Sultan of Perak (d. 1984)
- August 19 – Willard Boyle, Canadian physicist (d. 2011)
- August 21 – Dalia Wood, Canadian politician (d. 2013)
- August 22 – Orlando Ramón Agosti, Argentine general (d. 1997)
- August 23
  - Robert Solow, American economist, Nobel Prize laureate (d. 2023)
  - Wang Danfeng, Chinese actress (d. 2018)
- August 24 – Ahmadou Ahidjo, President of Cameroon (d. 1989)
- August 25 – Zsuzsa Körmöczy, Hungarian tennis player and coach (d. 2006)
- August 29
  - María Dolores Pradera, Spanish singer, actress (d. 2018)
  - Dinah Washington, African-American singer, pianist (d. 1963)
- August 31 – Buddy Hackett, American actor and comedian (d. 2003)

=== September ===
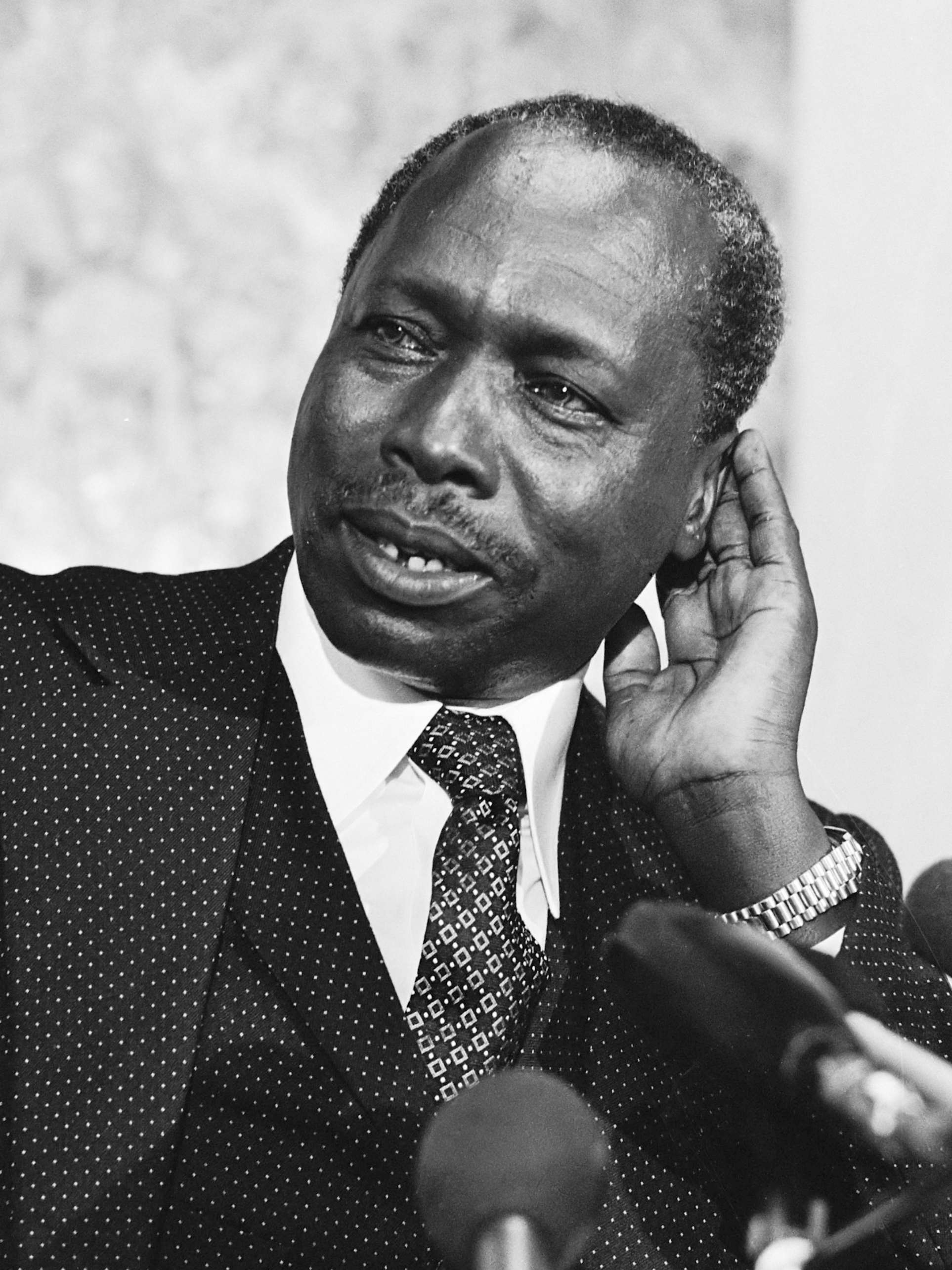
Daniel arap Moi

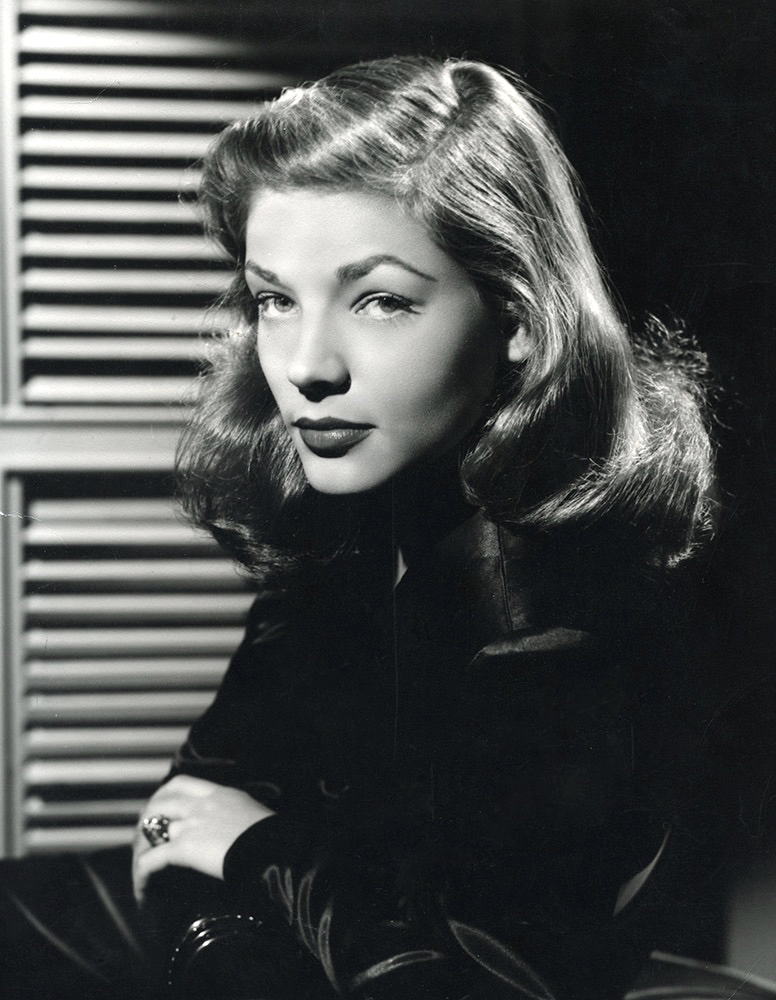
Lauren Bacall

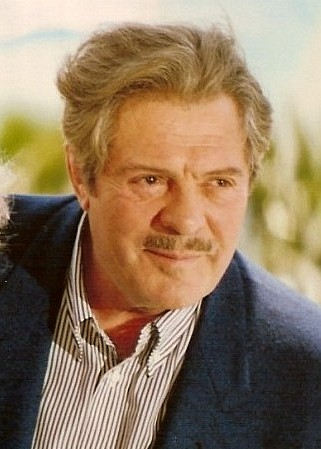
Marcello Mastroianni

- September 1 – Francis Clifford Smith, longest serving American prisoner
- September 2 – Daniel arap Moi, 2nd President of Kenya (d. 2020)
- September 4
  - Joan Aiken, English writer (d. 2004)
  - Simone Iff, French politician (d. 2014)
- September 7 – Daniel Inouye, American politician (d. 2012)
- September 8 – Mimi Parent, Canadian painter (d. 2005)
- September 9
  - Jane Greer, American actress (d. 2001)
  - Sylvia Miles, American actress (d. 2019)
  - Russell M. Nelson, 17th President of the Church of Jesus Christ of Latter-day Saints (d. 2025)
  - Rik Van Steenbergen, Belgian cyclist (d. 2003)
- September 11 – Rudolf Vrba, Slovak-Jewish Holocaust survivor, escapee from Auschwitz (d. 2006)
- September 13 – Maurice Jarre, French composer (d. 2009)
- September 15 – György Lázár, 50th Prime Minister of Hungary (d. 2014)
- September 16 – Lauren Bacall, American actress (d. 2014)
- September 18 – Eloísa Mafalda, Brazilian actress (d. 2018)
- September 19 – Suchitra Mitra, Indian singer and composer (d. 2011)
- September 20
  - Hartini, wife of President Sukarno of Indonesia (d. 2002)
  - Akkineni Nageswara Rao, Indian actor and producer (d. 2014)
- September 21 – Hermann Buhl, Austrian mountaineer (d. 1957)
- September 22
  - Bernard Gauthier, French racing cyclist (d. 2018)
  - Emile Wijntuin, Surinamese politician (d. 2020)
  - Rosamunde Pilcher, English novelist (d. 2019)
- September 24 – Nina Bocharova, Soviet gymnast (d. 2020)
- September 26 – Marcello Mastroianni, Italian actor (d. 1996)
- September 30 – Truman Capote, American author (d. 1984)

=== October ===
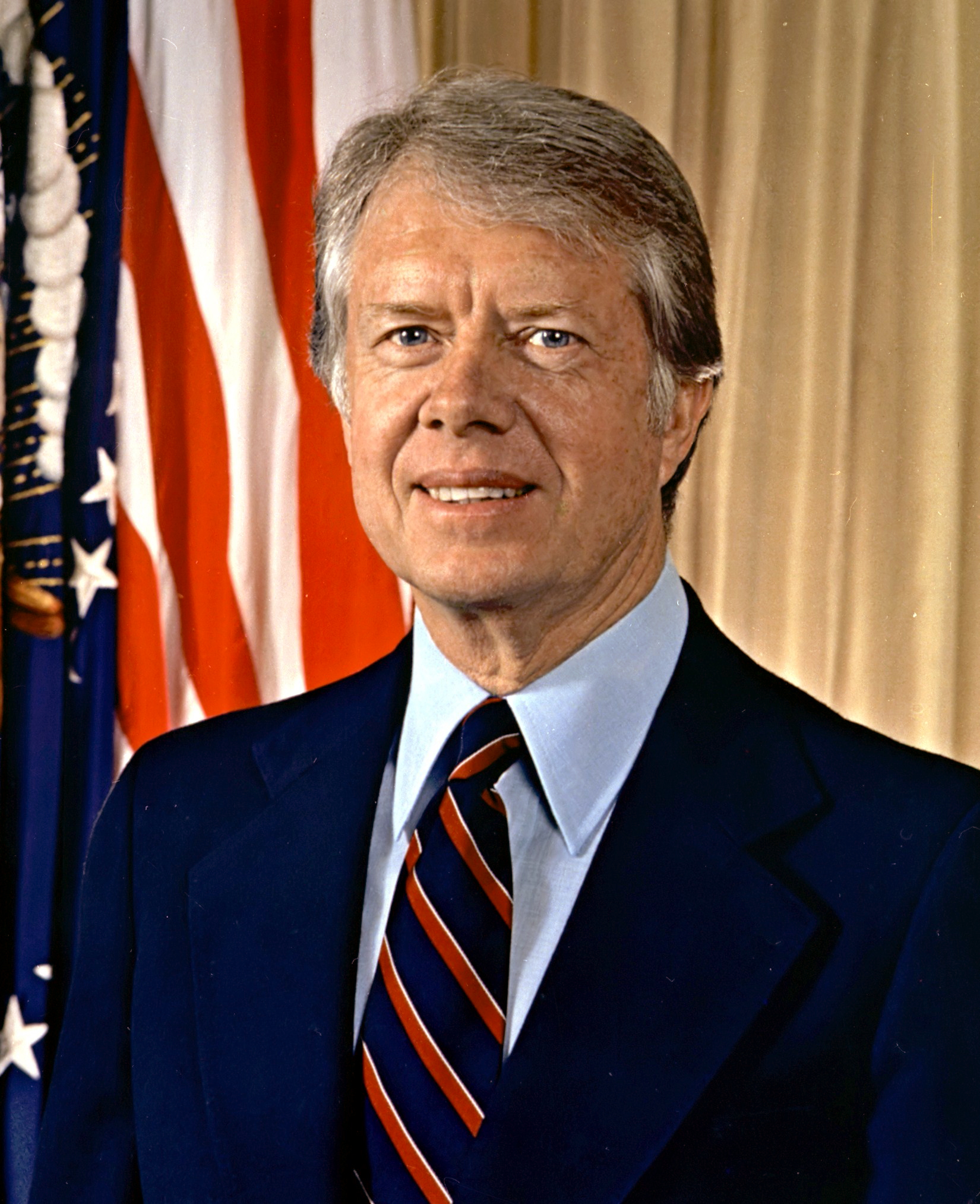
Jimmy Carter

- October 1
  - Jimmy Carter, 39th President of the United States, recipient of the Nobel Peace Prize (d. 2024)
  - William Rehnquist, 16th Chief Justice of the United States (d. 2005)
- October 10
  - Umar Wirahadikusumah, 4th Vice President of Indonesia (d. 2003)
  - Ed Wood, American B-movie producer (d. 1978)
- October 11 – Mal Whitfield, American Olympic athlete (d. 2015)
- October 14
  - Robert Webber, American actor (d. 1989)
  - Ramón Castro Ruz, Cuban revolutionary (d. 2016)
- October 15
  - Henry Sy, Chinese-Filipino business magnate (d. 2019)
  - Lee Iacocca, American industrialist (d. 2019)
- October 16 – Prince Makonnen, member of the Ethiopian royal family (d. 1957)
- October 19 – Lubomír Štrougal, Czech politician (d. 2023)
- October 21 – Chin Peng, Secretary-General of the Malayan Communist Party (d. 2013)
- October 24 – Aji Muhammad Salehuddin II, Indonesian royal (d. 2018)
- October 29 – Bernard Middleton, British restoration bookbinder (d. 2019)

=== November ===
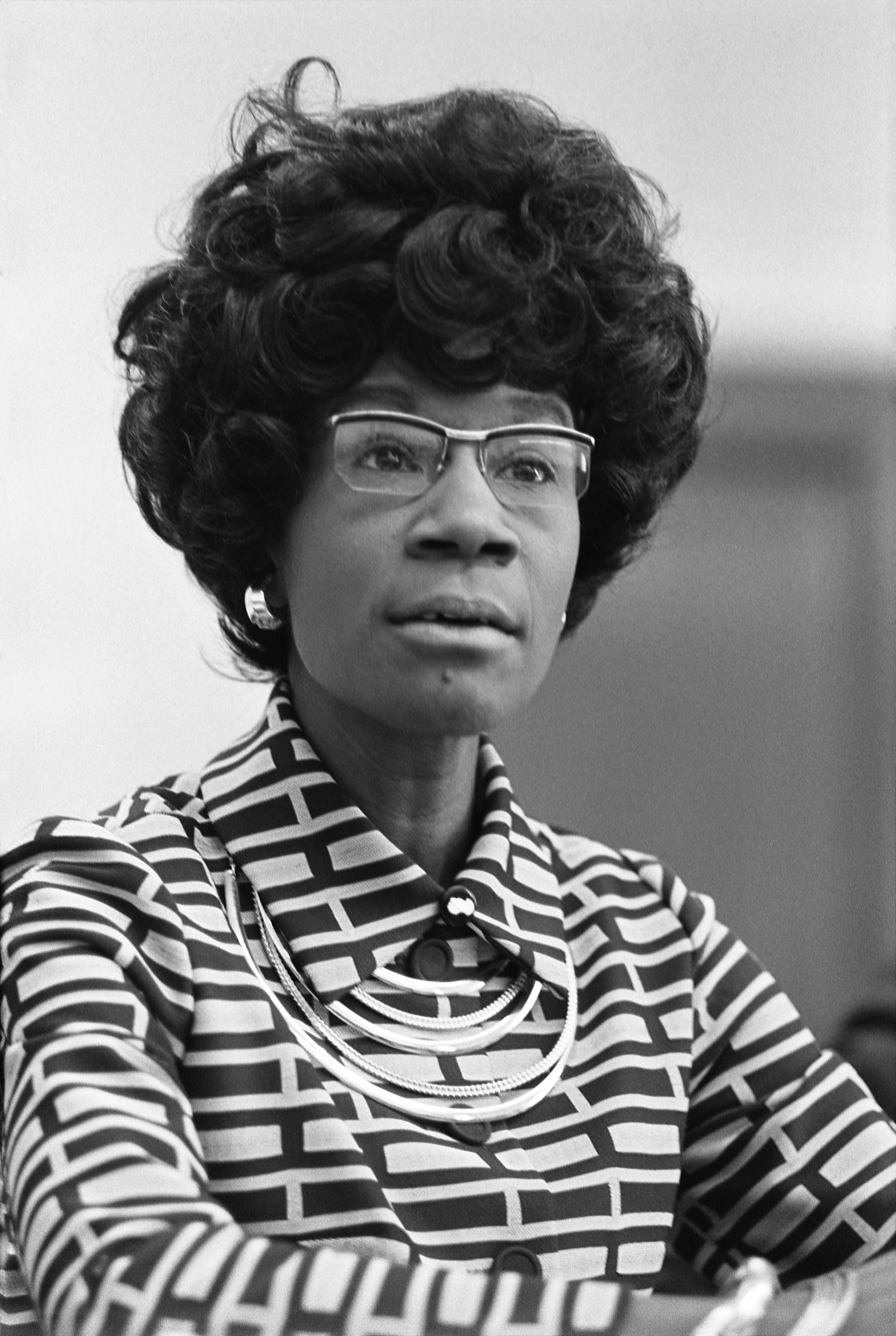
Shirley Chisholm

- November 1 – Süleyman Demirel, President of Turkey (d. 2015)
- November 3 – Erzsébet Gulyás-Köteles, Hungarian gymnast (d. 2019)
- November 8
  - Johnny Bower, Canadian ice hockey player (d. 2017)
  - Dmitry Yazov, Marshal of the Soviet Union (d. 2020)
- November 9 – Robert Frank, Swiss photographer (d. 2019)
- November 11 – Sunder Lal Patwa, Indian politician (d. 2016)
- November 13 – Motoo Kimura, Japanese population geneticist (d. 1994)
- November 16
  - Erika Mahringer, Austrian alpine skier (d. 2018)
  - Mel Patton, American athlete (d. 2014)
- November 19 – William Russell, English actor (d. 2024)
- November 20 – Benoit Mandelbrot, Polish-born mathematician (d. 2010)
- November 21
  - Joseph Campanella, American actor (d. 2018)
  - Christopher Tolkien, English author, academic and J. R. R. Tolkien's son (d. 2020)
- November 22 – Geraldine Page, American actress (d. 1987)
- November 23 – Anita Linda, Filipino actress (d. 2020)
- November 25
  - Paul Desmond, American jazz alto saxophonist and composer (d. 1977)
  - Takaaki Yoshimoto, Japanese poet, critic and philosopher (d. 2012)
  - A. Hamid Arief, Indonesian actor (d. 1992)
- November 26 – Bhekimpi Dlamini, 4th Prime Minister of Swaziland (d. 1999)
- November 28 – Dennis Brutus, South African poet and anti-apartheid activist (d. 2009)
- November 30
  - Shirley Chisholm, African-American politician (d. 2005)
  - Allan Sherman, American comedy writer, television producer and song parodist (d. 1973)

=== December ===
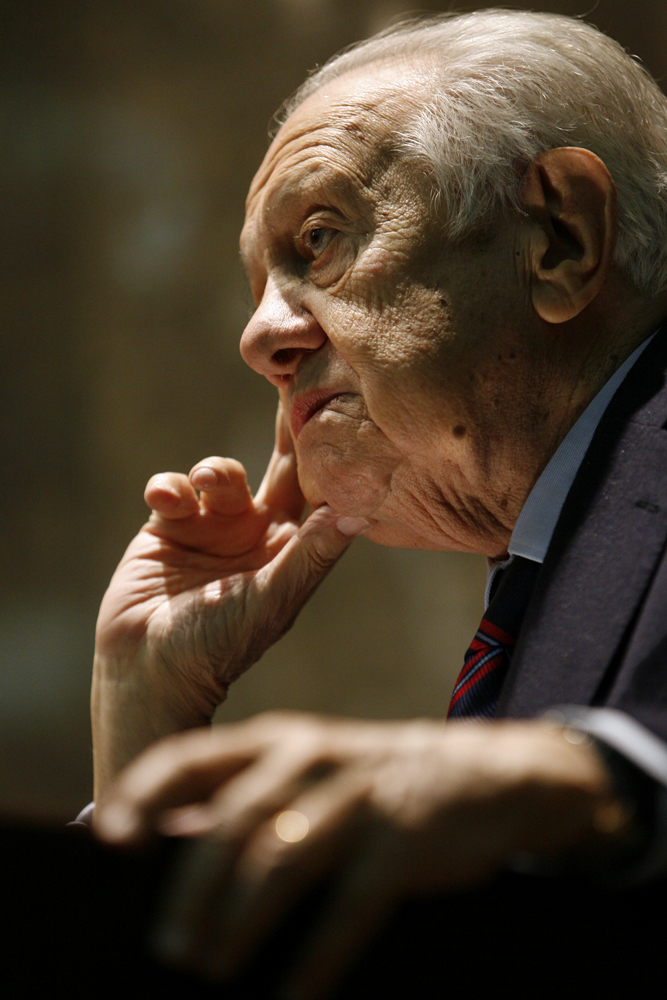
Mário Soares

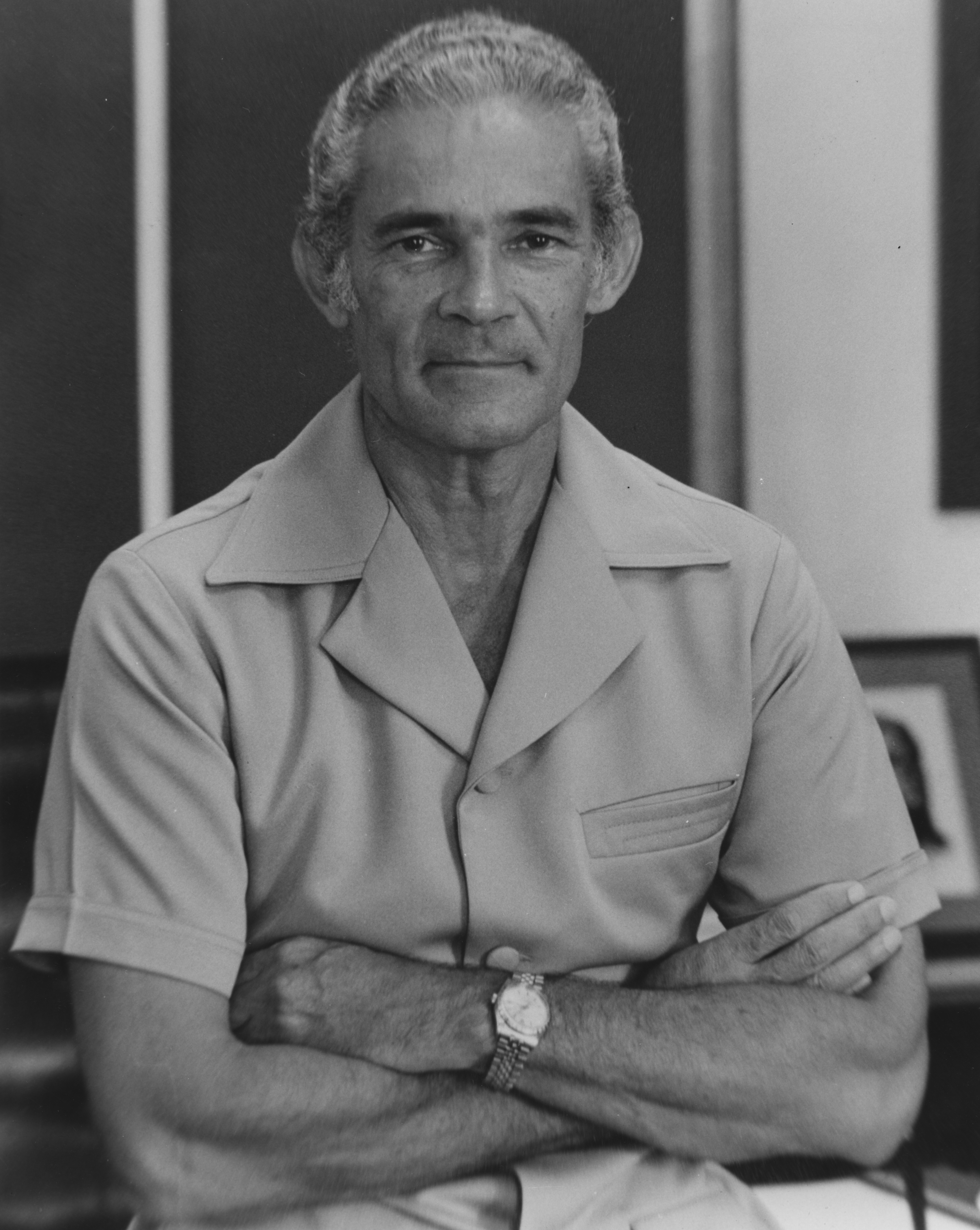
Michael Manley

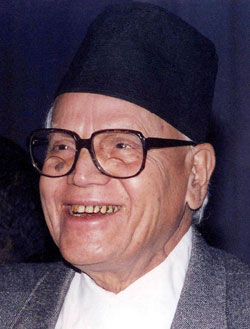
Krishna Prasad Bhattarai

- December 2 – Alexander Haig, American politician, U.S. Secretary of State (d. 2010)
- December 3 – Francisco Sionil José, Filipino novelist, Philippine National Artist for Literature (d. 2022)
- December 4 – Jakub Nowakowski, Polish zoologist, participant of the Warsaw Uprising
- December 6 – Wally Cox, American television, motion picture actor (d. 1973)
- December 7
  - Bent Fabric, Danish pianist and composer (d. 2020)
  - Mário Soares, 105th Prime Minister of Portugal, 17th President of Portugal (d. 2017)
- December 10 – Michael Manley, 4th Prime Minister of Jamaica (d. 1997)
- December 12 – Ed Koch, Mayor of New York City (1978–1989) (d. 2013)
- December 13
  - Krishna Prasad Bhattarai, 29th Prime Minister of Nepal (d. 2011)
  - Maria Riva, German-born American actress (d. 2025)
- December 14 – Raj Kapoor, Indian actor, producer and director (d. 1988)
- December 16 – Nissim Ezekiel, Indian Jewish poet, actor, playwright, editor and art critic (d. 2004)
- December 19
  - Michel Tournier, French writer (d. 2016)
  - Cicely Tyson, American actress (d. 2021)
- December 23 – Bob Kurland, American basketball player (d. 2013)
- December 24
  - Abdirizak Haji Hussein, Somali diplomat, politician and 4th Prime Minister of Somalia (d. 2014)
  - Mohammed Rafi, Indian playback singer (d. 1980)
- December 25
  - Moktar Ould Daddah, 1st President of Mauritania (d. 2003)
  - Rod Serling, American television screenwriter (The Twilight Zone) (d. 1975)
  - Atal Bihari Vajpayee, 10th Prime Minister of India (d. 2018)
  - Fatimah Hashim, Malaysian politician (d. 2010)
- December 28 – Girma Wolde-Giorgis, 2nd President of Ethiopia (d. 2018)
- December 30 – Yvonne Brill, Canadian-American engineer (d. 2013)

== Deaths ==
=== January ===
Vladimir Lenin

- January 2 – Sabine Baring-Gould, British composer and novelist (b. 1834)
- January 13 – Georg Hermann Quincke, German physicist (b. 1834)
- January 14 – Luther Emmett Holt, American pediatrician (b. 1855)
- January 16 – Licerio Gerónimo, Filipino military leader (b. 1855)
- January 21 – Vladimir Lenin, Russian revolutionary, first Premier of the Soviet Union (b. 1870)
- January 24
  - Auguste-Louis-Alberic, prince d'Arenberg (b. 1837)
  - Marie-Adélaïde, Grand Duchess of Luxembourg (b. 1894)
- January 28 – Teófilo Braga, Portuguese writer (b. 1843)
- January 30 – Prince Ferdinand, Duke of Montpensier (b. 1884)

=== February ===
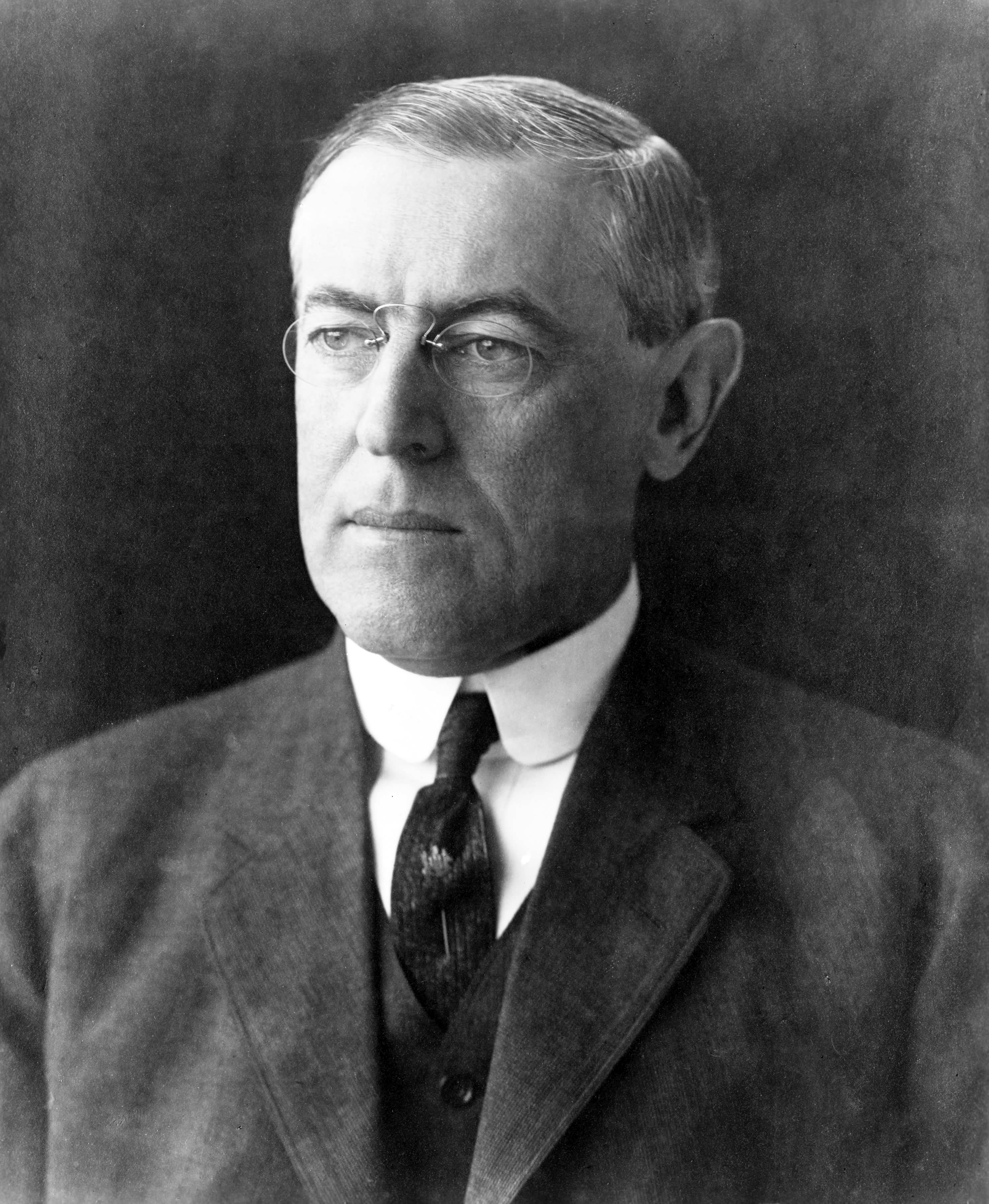
Woodrow Wilson

- February 3 – Woodrow Wilson, 28th President of the United States, Nobel Peace Prize recipient (b. 1856)
- February 11 – Jacques Loeb, German–born American physiologist and biologist (b. 1859)
- February 16
  - John William Kendrick, American railroad executive (b. 1853)
  - Wilhelm Schmidt, German pioneer of superheated steam for use in locomotives (b. 1858)
- February 17
  - Augustin Boué de Lapeyrère, French admiral (b. 1852)
  - Oskar Merikanto, Finnish composer (b. 1868)
- February 29 – Emily Ruete, princess of Zanzibar (b. 1844)

=== March ===
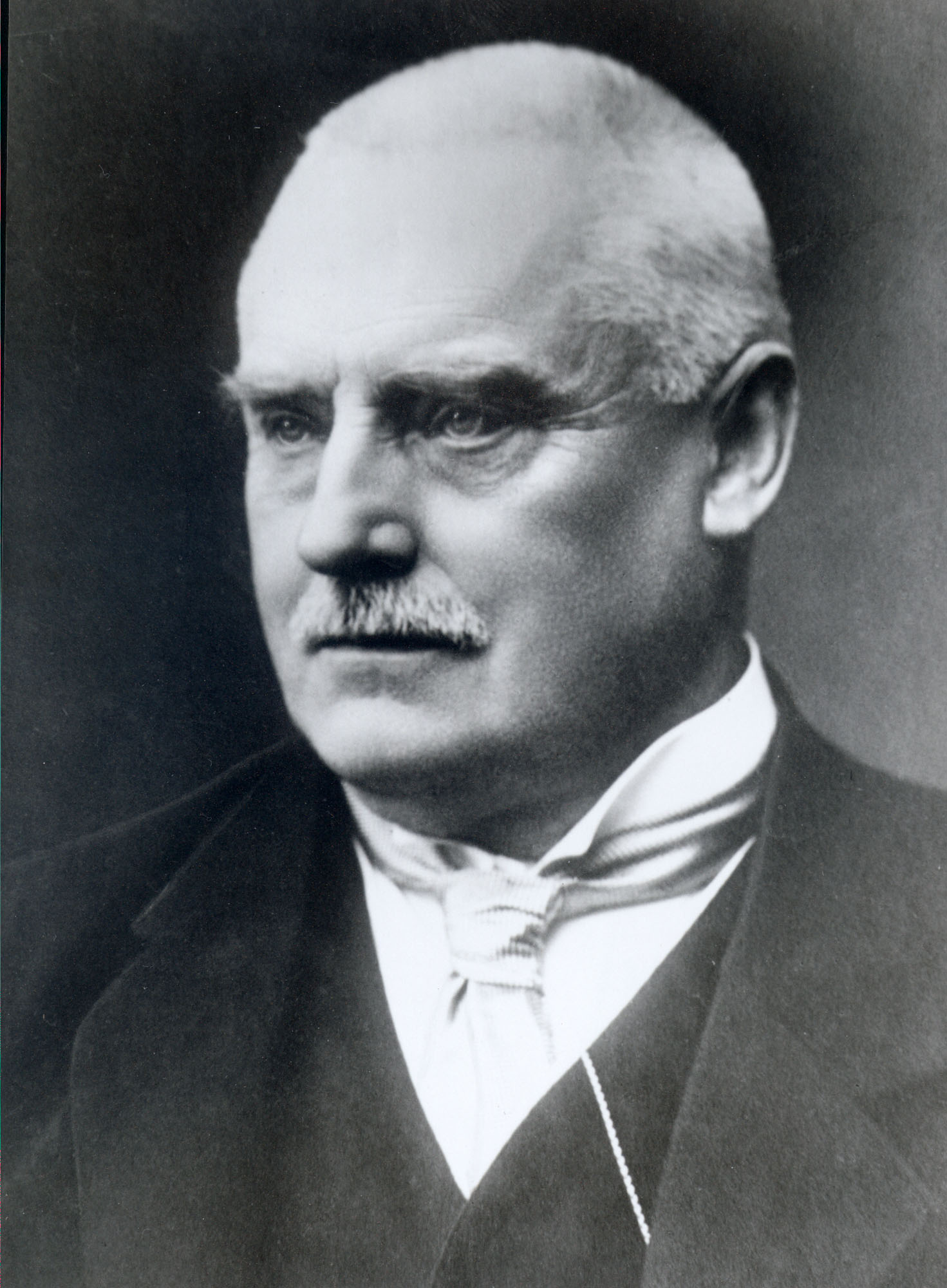
Willert Konow

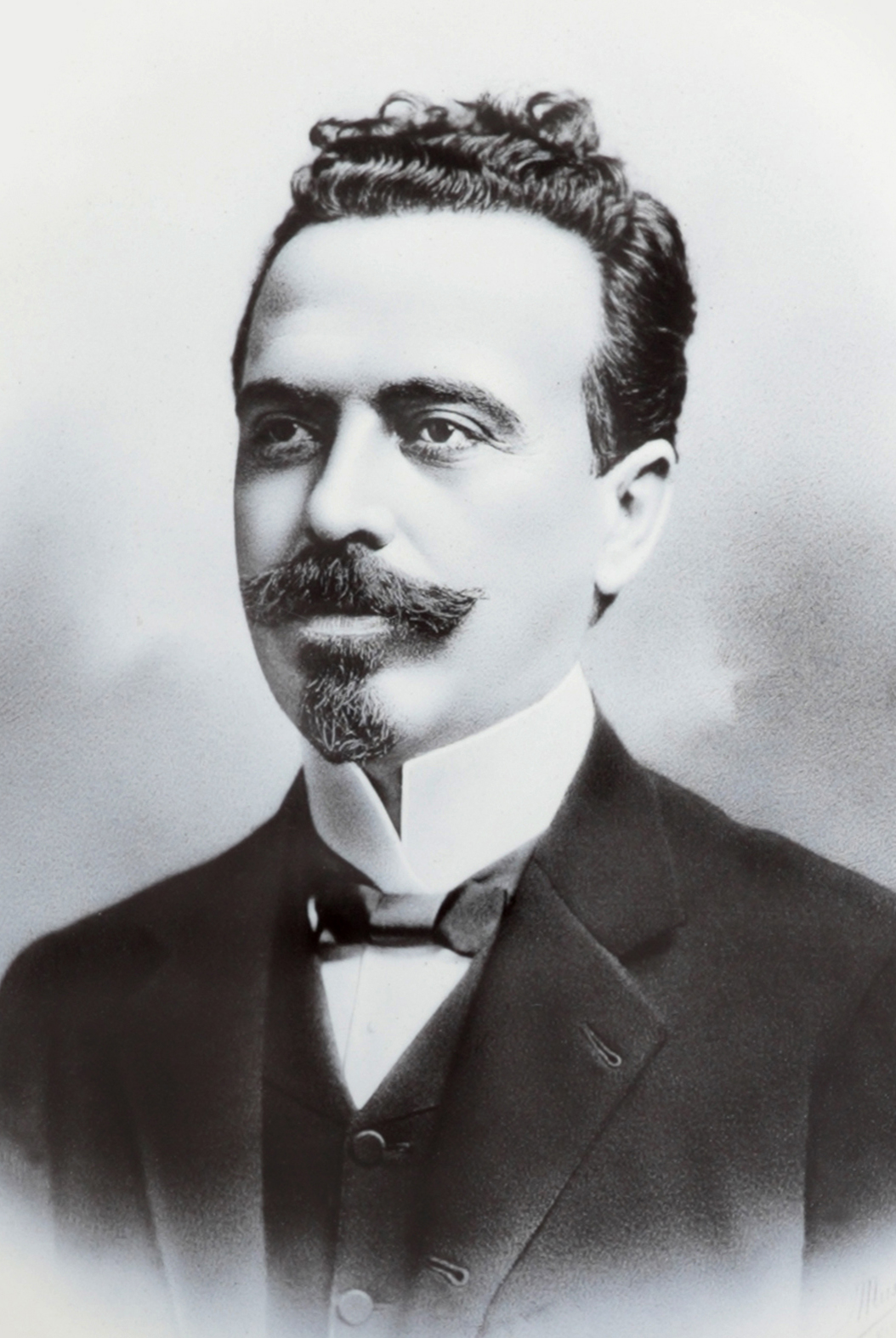
Nilo Pecanha

- March 4 – Fanny Eaton, Jamaican artist's model (b. 1835)
- March 9 – Panagiotis Danglis, Greek military leader, politician (b. 1853)
- March 11
  - Duke Peter Alexandrovich of Oldenburg (b. 1868)
  - Ivan Evstratiev Geshov, 18th Prime Minister of Bulgaria (b. 1849)
- March 15 – Wollert Konow, Norwegian politician, 4th Prime Minister of Norway (b. 1845)
- March 22
  - Louis Delluc, French film director (b. 1890)
  - Robert Nivelle, French World War I general (b. 1856)
- March 24 – Prince Kachō Hirotada of Japan (b. 1902)
- March 29 – Sir Charles Villiers Stanford, Irish composer, resident in United Kingdom (b. 1852)
- March 31 – Nilo Peçanha, Brazilian politician and 7th President of Brazil (b. 1867)

=== April ===
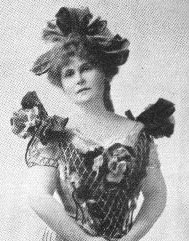
Marie Corelli

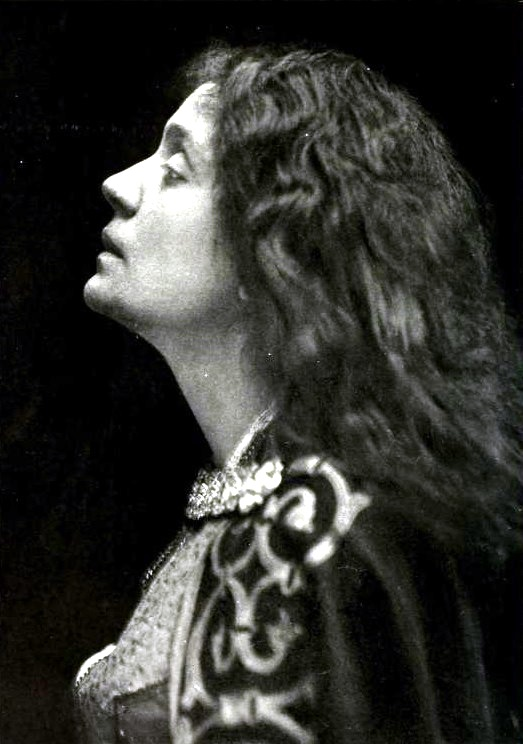
Eleonora Duse

- April 4 – Arnold Pick, Czech-German neurologist and psychiatrist (b. 1851)
- April 10
  - Rafael Yglesias Castro, Costa Rican politician, 16th President of Costa Rica (b. 1861)
  - Hugo Stinnes, German industrialist, politician (b. 1870)
- April 14 – Louis Sullivan, American architect (b. 1856)
- April 18 – Paul Boyton, Irish-American extreme water sports pioneer (b. 1848)
- April 21
  - Marie Corelli, English novelist (b. 1855)
  - Eleonora Duse, Italian actress (b. 1858)
- April 24 – G. Stanley Hall, American psychologist, educator (b. 1846)

=== May ===
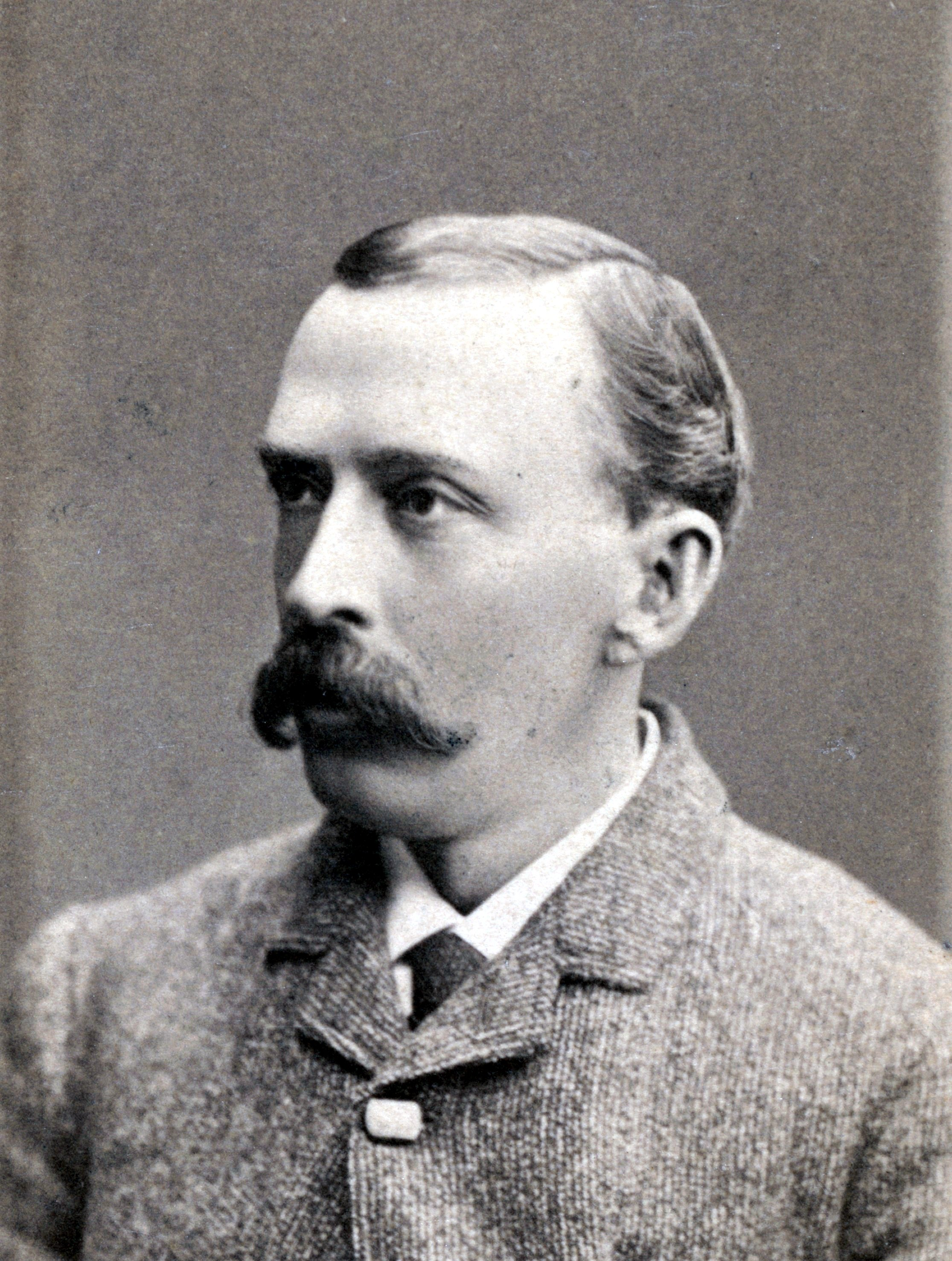
George Kennan

- May 4 – E. Nesbit, British author (b. 1858)
- May 6 – Carel Steven Adama van Scheltema, Dutch poet (b. 1877)
- May 10 – George Kennan, American explorer (b. 1845)
- May 15 – Paul-Henri-Benjamin d'Estournelles de Constant, French diplomat, recipient of the Nobel Peace Prize (b. 1852)
- May 26 – Victor Herbert, Irish composer (b. 1859)

=== June ===
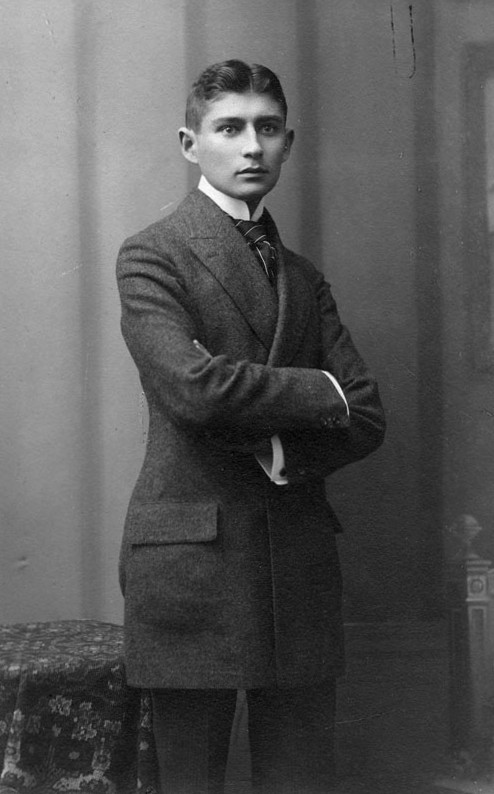
Franz Kafka

- June 3 – Franz Kafka, Austrian author (The Trial) (b. 1883)
- June 9
  - Andrew Irvine, British mountain climber (lost on Mount Everest) (b. 1902)
  - George Mallory, British mountain climber (lost on Mount Everest) (b. 1886)
- June 10 – Giacomo Matteotti, Italian socialist politician (assassinated) (b. 1885)
- June 11 – Théodore Dubois, French composer, teacher (b. 1837)
- June 30
  - Jacob Israël de Haan, Dutch-Jewish literary writer, journalist (b. 1881)
  - Johannes von Eben, German general (b. 1855)

=== July ===
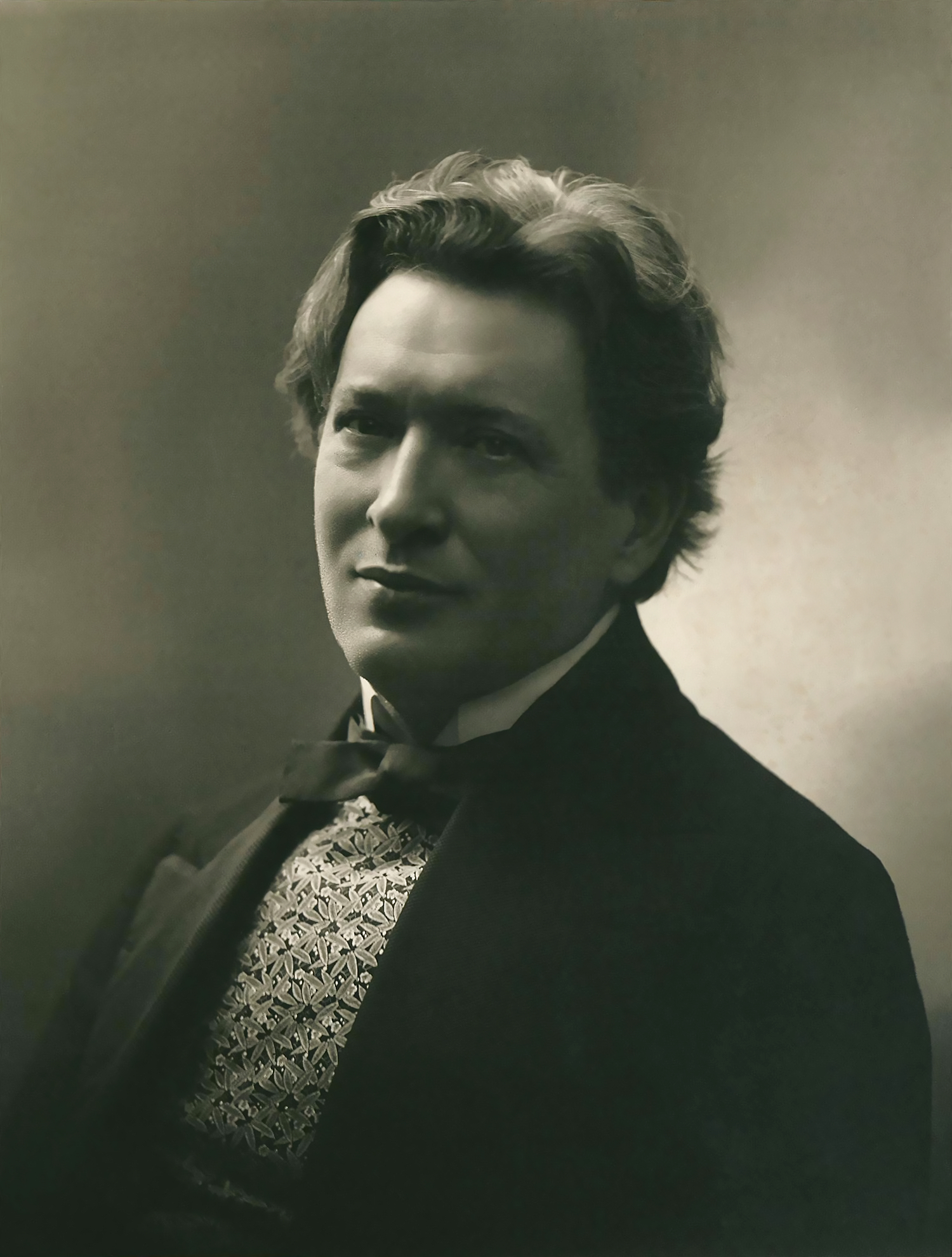
Ferruccio Busoni

- July 14 – Isabella Ford, British socialist, feminist, trade unionist and writer (b. 1855)
- July 17 – Isabella Stewart Gardner, American art collector, philanthropist (b. 1840)
- July 23 – Frank Frost Abbott, American classical scholar (b. 1860)
- July 27 – Ferruccio Busoni, Italian pianist, composer (b. 1866)

=== August ===
- August 3 – Joseph Conrad, Polish-born author (b. 1857)
- August 5 – Teodor Teodorov, 19th Prime Minister of Bulgaria (b. 1859)
- August 7 – Bruce Grit, African-American historian, ex-slave (b. 1856)
- August 15 – Francis Knollys, 1st Viscount Knollys, British Private Secretary to King Edward VII (b. 1837)
- August 17
  - Paul Natorp, German philosopher (b. 1854)
  - Pavel Urysohn, Russian mathematician (b. 1898)
- August 18 – Antoine de Mitry, French general (b. 1857)
- August 25 – Mariano Álvarez, Filipino general (b. 1818)
- August 31 – Todor Aleksandrov, Bulgarian revolutionary (b. 1881)

=== September ===
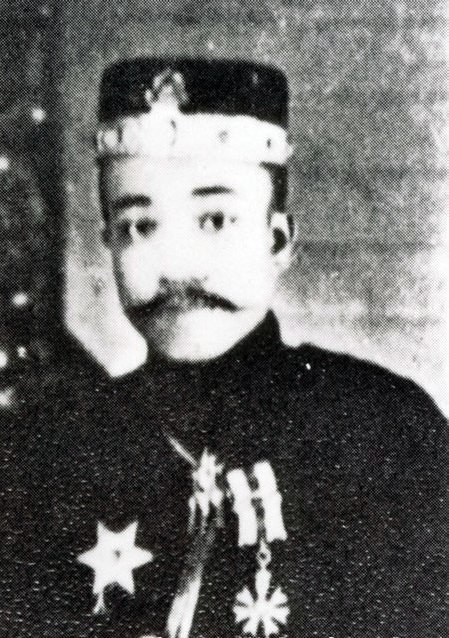
Sultan Muhammad Jamalul Alam II

- September 1 – Samuel Baldwin Marks Young, American general, first Chief of Staff of the United States Army (b. 1840)
- September 6 – Archduchess Marie Valerie of Austria (b. 1868)
- September 15 – Frank Chance, American baseball player, MLB Hall of Famer (b. 1877)
- September 18 – F. H. Bradley, English philosopher (b. 1846)
- September 19 – Muhammad Jamalul Alam II, Sultan of Brunei (b. 1889)
- September 22 – Hermann Kövess von Kövessháza, Austro-Hungarian field marshal (b. 1854)
- September 24
  - Manuel Estrada Cabrera, 13th President of Guatemala (b. 1857)
  - Consort Jin, Qing Dynasty imperial consort (b. 1873)
- September 25 – Lotta Crabtree, American stage actress (b. 1847)

=== October ===
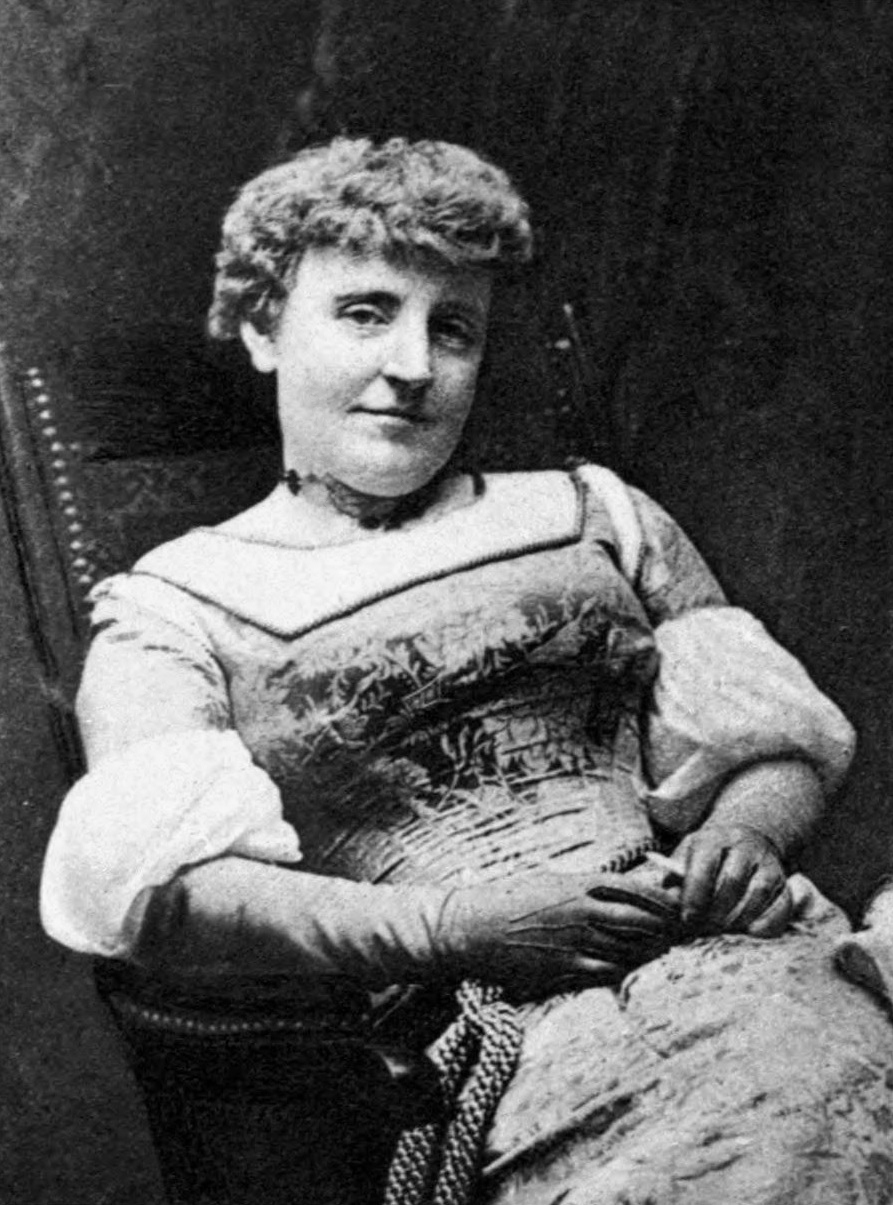
Frances Hodgson Burnett

- October 12 – Anatole France, French writer, Nobel Prize laureate (b. 1844)
- October 18
  - Giovanni Ancillotto, Italian World War I flying ace (b. 1896)
  - Franz Schrader, French mountaineer, geographer, cartographer, and landscape painter (b. 1844)
- October 26 – Luigi Pelloux, 14th Prime Minister of Italy (b. 1839)
- October 29 – Frances Hodgson Burnett, Anglo-American writer (b. 1849)

=== November ===
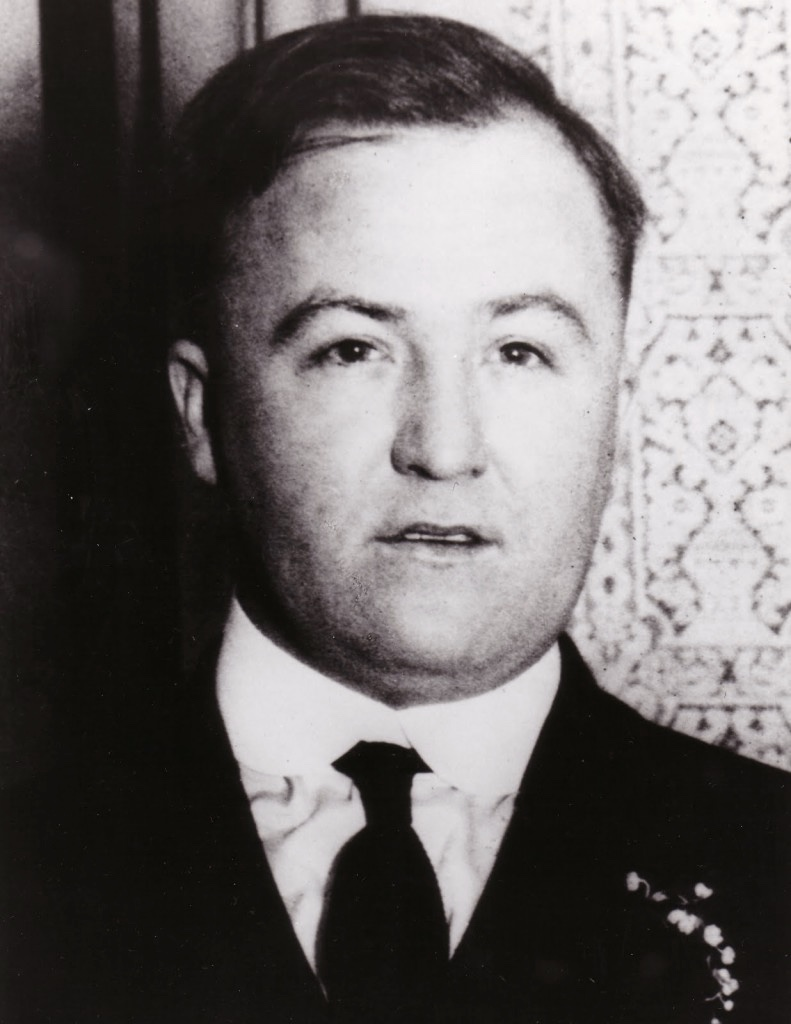
Dean O'Banion

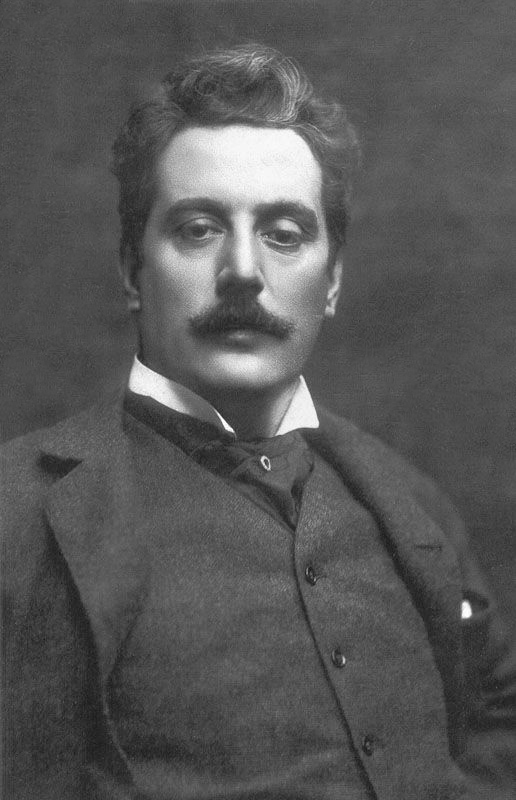
Giacomo Puccini

- November 3 – Mario di Carpegna, Italian general, politician (b. 1856)
- November 4 – Gabriel Fauré, French composer (b. 1845)
- November 9 – Henry Cabot Lodge, American politician (b. 1850)
- November 10
  - Sir Archibald Geikie, British geologist (b. 1835)
  - Dean O'Banion, American gangster (b. 1892)
- November 12 – E. D. Morel, French-born British journalist and politician (b. 1873)
- November 19 – Thomas H. Ince, American film producer (b. 1880)
- November 20 – Ebenezer Cobb Morley, English sportsman and the father of the Football Association and modern football (b. 1831)
- November 21 – Florence Harding, First Lady of the United States (b. 1860)
- November 29 – Giacomo Puccini, Italian composer (b. 1858)

=== December ===
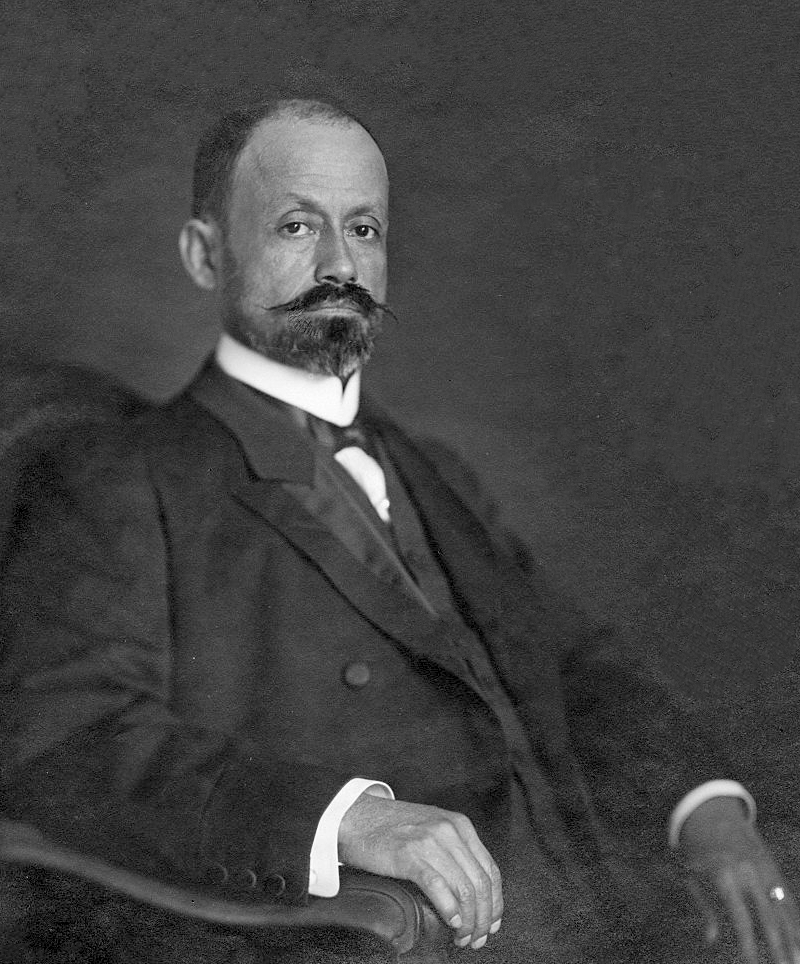
Cipriano Castro

- December 2
  - Kazimieras Būga, Lithuanian linguist (b. 1879)
  - Hugo von Seeliger, German astronomer (b. 1849)
- December 4 – Cipriano Castro, Venezuelan military officer, politician and 38th President of Venezuela (b. 1858)
- December 5 – S. Subramania Iyer, Indian lawyer and freedom fighter (b. 1842)
- December 6 – Gene Stratton-Porter, American author, screenwriter and naturalist (b. 1863)
- December 8 – Xaver Scharwenka, Polish-German composer (b. 1850)
- December 11 – Samuel Gompers, American labor leader (b. 1850)
- December 15 – Prince Wilhelm of Saxe-Weimar-Eisenach (b. 1853)
- December 19 – Luis Emilio Recabarren, Chilean politician, founder of the Communist Party of Chile. (b. 1876)
- December 20 – Ricardo Bellver, Spanish sculptor (b. 1845)
- December 21 – Anna Hierta-Retzius, Swedish women's rights activist (b. 1841)
- December 27 – Agda Meyerson, Swedish nurse, healthcare profession activist (b. 1866)
- December 29 – Carl Spitteler, Swiss writer, Nobel Prize laureate (b. 1845)
- December 31 – Sir Samuel Knaggs, British civil servant (b. 1856)

== Nobel Prizes ==

- Physics – Manne Siegbahn
- Chemistry – not awarded
- Physiology or Medicine – Willem Einthoven
- Literature – Władysław Stanisław Reymont
- Peace – not awarded
