= List of ecofeminist authors =

An alphabetized list of ecofeminist writers includes the following:

- Diane Ackerman
- Carol J. Adams
- Sharon Blackie
- Margarita Carretero-González
- Rachel Carson
- Carol P. Christ
- Chris Cuomo
- Mary Daly
- Françoise d'Eaubonne
- Barbara Ehrenreich
- Clarissa Pinkola Estes
- Alice Fulton
- Greta Gaard
- Chellis Glendinning
- Alice Gorman
- Mary Grey
- Susan Griffin
- Donna Haraway
- Helena Norberg-Hodge
- Allison Hedge Coke
- Heidi Hutner
- Valerie Ann Kaaland
- Stephanie Kaza
- Petra Kelly
- lisa kemmerer
- Robin Wall Kimmerer
- Anna Kingsford
- Winona LaDuke
- Joanna Macy
- Wangari Muta Maathai
- Lynn Margulis
- Carolyn Merchant
- Maria Mies
- Mary Midgely
- Layli Phillips
- Gloria Feman Orenstein
- Judith Plaskow
- Val Plumwood
- Alicia Puleo
- Arundhati Roy
- Rosemary Radford Ruether
- Ariel Salleh
- Carol Lee Sanchez
- Vandana Shiva
- Leanne Betasamosake Simpson
- Charlene Spretnak
- Starhawk
- Merlin Stone
- Sophie Strand
- Sheri S. Tepper
- Mary Evelyn Tucker
- Richard Twine
- Linda Vance
- Alice Walker
- Barbara Walker
- Marilyn Waring
- Karen J. Warren
- Sheila Watt-Cloutier
- Terry Tempest Williams
- Laura Wright

== Literature and poetry ==
- Kelli Russell Agodon
- Margaret Atwood
- Jean Auel
- Marion Zimmer Bradley
- Octavia Butler
- Climbing PoeTree - Alixa Garcia, Naima Penniman
- Natalie Diaz
- Annie Dillard
- Charlotte Perkins Gilman
- Geneen Marie Haugen
- Linda Hogan
- lisa kemmerer
- Sue Monk Kidd
- Barbara Kingsolver
- Ursula K. Le Guin
- Sylvia Lindsteadt
- Toni Morrison
- Sarah Rose Nordgren
- Mary Oliver
- Marge Piercy
- Patti Ann Rogers
- Nandini Sahu
- Eva Saulitis
- Ntozake Shange
- Alice Walker
