= Women and the environment =

In the early 1960s, an interest in women and their connection with the environment was sparked largely by Ester Boserup's book Woman's Role in Economic Development. Starting in the 1980s, policy makers and governments became more mindful of the connection between the environment and gender issues. Changes regarding natural resource and environmental management were made with the specific role of women in mind. According to the World Bank in 1991, "Women play an essential role in the management of natural resources, including soil, water, forests and energy...and often have a profound traditional and contemporary knowledge of the natural world around them". Whereas women were previously neglected or ignored, there was increasing attention to the impact of women on the natural environment and, in return, the effects the environment has on the health and well-being of women. The gender-environment relations have ramifications in regard to the understanding of nature between men and women, the management and distribution of resources and responsibilities, and the day-to-day life and well-being of people.

== Women's connection with the environment ==
=== Women, environment, and development (WED) debate ===
Different discourses have shaped the way that sustainable development is approached, and women have become more integrated into shaping these ideas. The definition of sustainable development is highly debated, but is defined by Harcourt as a way to "establish equity between generations" and to take into account "social, economic, and environmental needs to conserve non-renewable resources" and decrease the amount of waste produced by industrialization. The first discourse that emerged was women in development (WID), the perspective that advocated for women's status to be improved in developing countries. WID placed women as central actors in household, rural and market economies and looked to the hierarchical institution of western development to fix the issues that arise because of this. Critics of WID argued that as part of a larger western mindset, it perpetuates a colonial and liberal discourse that is incompatible with supporting the global population of women.

During the Progressive Era (late 19th to early 20th century), urbanization, industrialization, and the Women's Suffrage Movement all had an impact on the shifting gender roles and expectations in American society. The Progressive Era signaled a shift towards greater recognition of women's capabilities and contributions outside the home, even though societal expectations still prioritized women's roles as wives and mothers. This laid the groundwork for further advancements in women's rights and gender equality in the 20th century. A variety of people, including scientists, grassroots activists, and conservationists, attempted to address environmental issues during this time period and were part of the environmental movement. Women were important activists, educators, and public health and environmental conservation advocates. Women's perspectives on environmental issues are shaped and motivated to participate in efforts to address them by their experiences as caregivers for the home and family, as well as by their increasing presence in urban environments. Ad hoc groups of women were formed to address various issues including food safety, water quality, public health in schools, food disposal, street cleanliness, meat handling, and stable nuisances.

These women's environmental organizations, such as the New York Ladies' Health Protective Association, emphasized their role in monitoring and enhancing the cleanliness and hygiene of urban areas by framing their mission as a type of municipal housekeeping. They claimed that because women are the primary caregivers for their families and homes, they are in a unique position to address these issues because they are constantly exposed to the negative effects of insufficient urban sanitation practices. Because men could not be trusted to protect the environment, many even thought that environmental activism was like doing housework. Due to this belief, women's involvement in the environmental movement expanded the influence of women outside the home and into the public sphere of environmental activism, challenging traditional gender roles.

The next shift in discourse took place in the early 1970s, where people began to critique the roots of development and find alternative ways to interact with the global community and developing countries, with women and the environment as central actors. One such alternative was defined as women, environment, development (WED). According to Schultz et al., "The women, environment and development debate (WED-debate) is anchored in a critical view of development policies where the link between modernization/industrialization and technology on the one hand and environmental deterioration on the other is focused". WED discourse is centralized around the synthesis of different ideologies, including ecofeminism. Ecofeminism may be seen as a root ideology for WED, where women are viewed with a biological connection to nature that enables them to have a deeper connection and stewardship of it. This ideology was transformed into the political sphere as women having a socially constructed connection to nature through global systems.

In the 1990s, the United Nations International Research and Training Institute for the Advancement of Women (INSTRAW) instituted programs based on the WED discourse. These programs were in response to the relation between gender and environmental violence such as waste disposal, pesticide use nuclear testing, and other detrimental environmental practices.

Many of these programs did not produce the desired impacts on women. The WED discourse placed emphasis on women as solution holders to environmental issues. However, policies were not directed at empowering women but the sectors that women are involved in, such as agriculture. Leach argues that the overall impact of politicizing the role of women and the environment through the WED discourse appropriated women's labor without providing them with proper resources or capacity to succeed.

=== Farming and agriculture ===
In the majority of the world, women are responsible for farm work and related domestic food production. An increasing number of women are taking over and expanding their involvement in agricultural tasks, but this has not changed the gender division of labor with regard to reproductive work. Ester Boserup found that "in many African tribes, nearly all the tasks connected with food production continue to be left to women". Schultz et al. (2001), found that "90% of women in the developing world, where most of the planet's biological wealth is found, depend on their land for survival. Women head 30% of the households in developing countries, 80% of food production in sub-Saharan Africa is done by women, 60% in Asia and 50% in Latin America. Even though women are largely responsible for the actual agricultural work performed, men generally own the land, therefore controlling women's labor upon the land.

There is evidence showing that improving women's access to agricultural resources can boost yields by 20–30% and overall production in underdeveloped nations by 2.5–4%. Increased production might reduce global hunger by 12–17%.

==== Africa ====
Ester Boserup examined the farming systems of men and women in Africa and found that "in many African tribes, nearly all the tasks connected with food production continue to be left to women". In Botswana, men typically have greater access to advanced technologies and plowing abilities. Zambia also has a high percentage of women farmers yet they are not explicitly recognize and often neglected entirely. Consistent lack of access to credit, mobility, technological advancements, and land ownership further complicate women's agricultural roles. A group of women in Kenya began farming trees way before climate change was prioritized because they had seen what happens to lands that are depleted of its nutrients and the adverse effects.

In Zimbabwe, direct impacts of climate change and environmental degradation has on women and girls include:

- An increase in the amount of time spent doing expected unpaid work like collecting water and firewood.
- Limitation on ability to accelerate their careers and or income generating activities and education as they have fewer hours to spend on these activities.
- Activities like illegal mining reduce the amount of land available for farming which impacts the economic survival of rural women who depend on farming as a source of income.
- Women, children and people with disabilities are more likely to be affected more by environmental disasters and their effects than other groups.

==== Latin America and Caribbean ====
In Peru, women often participate in food production and family farming yet they do not generally benefit directly from their labor. Their work is not considered as valuable as men's. Women in the Caribbean have always been associated with agriculture and do have access to land ownership. However, women still do not have the same access to technology as men and generally have smaller plots of land.

Dependence on nature and the environment for survival is common among women living in areas commonly designated as the Third World. Environmental feminists have argued that this dependence creates a deeply rooted connection between women and their surroundings. Women's dependence on natural resources, based on their responsibilities, creates a specific interest that may be different from the interests of men. Jiggins et al. suggests that women view nature uniquely in that they connect the land to immediate survival and concern for future generations, rather than treating the land as a resource with monetary value. With the development of newer technologies since the 1940s, there has been a shift to more non-farm activities; however, men participate in the shift more than women, leaving women behind. It is projected that as men continue to shift to urban livelihoods, the role of maintaining the household by farming will increasingly fall upon women. Especially during the neoliberal policy regime in Latin America, with the increasing use of exports, women were ideal for their 'gendered skills'. They were paid less for their farming labor and not likely to organize, coining the term 'feminization of responsibility'. Issues such as climate change could have a greater impact on women because the land they farm will be negatively affected.

==== Asia and Pacific Islands ====
In the Asian and Pacific Island regions, 58% of women involved in the economy are found in the agriculture sector. This involves work in own-account farms, labor in small enterprises for processing fruits, vegetables and fish, paid and unpaid work on other people's land, and collecting forest products.

Out of all the women working in this sector, 10–20% have been found to have tenure to the land they work on. Reasons for this number include economic and legal barriers. For example, women get fewer and smaller loans to acquire land than men.

One other factor that plays into women's land rights for agriculture is the cultural norms of the area. In Asia and the Pacific, women's societal roles have been defined by patriarchal norms, where men are viewed as breadwinners and women are viewed as caretakers. This can be expressed through the number of hours women spend doing unpaid care work per day. In developing countries in total, women spend 4 hours and 30 minutes of care work a day versus the 1 hour and 2 minutes that men spend.

As the main economic sector of Southeast Asia, agriculture includes over one quarter of Association of Southeast Asian States's (ASEAN) working women, a significant difference from OECD's 3.5% average. Members of ASEAN have cited increased threats to the sector from more frequent natural disasters due to climate change with significant gendered impacts. These events have different effects for each country and each region of Southeast Asia, but harms upon both gender equality and economic production through agriculture are common across the region. The Dawei Special Economic Zone (SEZ) and deep seaport, located in a border region of Myanmar and Thailand, is an industrial development project with alleviated environmental regulations, among other relaxed rules, marketed for business investment. Out of Myanmar, as for residents who are displaced from homes and their agriculture work due to the Dawei SEZ's development, new higher paying jobs, and usually land rights, are granted to men. Women, whose prior experiences have been agricultural, resort to informal, insecure, and smaller-scale farm labor.

In the Mekong River Delta Region of Vietnam, although women comprise about half of the labor involved in intensive rice production systems, they have the added responsibility of being the primary caretaker and securing food for their families. As climate change increasingly threatens agricultural systems, women in the Mekong Delta region face disproportionate risk to their livelihoods relative to men because of their dependency on the land for rice production combined with their role as domestic provider. In 2008, in the Sambas district of West Kalimantan, Indonesia, women protested oil palm plantation expansion and the land acquisitions associated with it. Although men were usually the legal owners of the land in conflict in Sambas, women are the main managers of the land and domestic care, meaning they would be disproportionately impacted by water pollution, land grabs and home loss, crop loss, and lack of other job opportunities, all due to increased palm production.

=== Fishing industry ===
==== Mexico ====
===== San Evaristo =====
In San Evaristo near Baja California Sur, Mexico Hunting, fishing and land ownership is the main source of income. Women are excluded from these activities even though they might have a land claim or are fishing for fun. The fishers are mostly men that work fourteen hours together in a boat so close together. They have their own ways of communication to build trust.

Men tell harmless lies or brag about their daily earnings, which leads to building intimacy and avoiding further conflict that might happen. It became an even more important social skill when the MPA (Marine Protection Atlas) limited their access to fishing sites by designating some of them as protected waters. Men needed to bond when they became rivals for resources. They build trust by teasing their masculinity by subjugating women and bragging about their sexual power. For example, they encourage a researcher to go to a strip club; they pretend to betray their wives. Eventually, they confessed that they were lying about it to prove themselves sexually powerful.

Women find these men's behaviors normal because they do not have access to the gender-based group to socialize and are limited to doing household work. When men build their own world distant from women and do not let any women in it, it is difficult for female conservationists to interact with them. Also, the male conservationist role in interacting with this male-dominant social capita is problematic.

=== Land ownership and property management ===
In many parts of the world, specifically developing countries, there is a great deal of inequality when it comes to land ownership. Traditional practices and bureaucratic factors often prevent women's access to natural resource development and management. Frequently, women do not have the right to own land and/or property, but they often are the ones who tend to the land. Bina Agarwal, has written a great deal about gender and land rights in Third World countries and according to her, "Hence, insofar as there is a gender and class-based division of labor and distribution of property and power, gender and class structure people's interactions with nature and so structure the effects of environmental change on people and their responses to it." Women's access to control of natural resources, land ownership and property management is a developing issue and is the subject of continuous debate in both the environmental realm and women's rights movement.

=== Women's property status and the likelihood of violence ===
Globally, "physical violence by husbands against wives is estimated to range between 10% and 50%" (p. 824). It is difficult to pinpoint the causes of marital violence but economic dependence is widely acknowledged as one of the main sources. Land or property ownership provides women who may be experiencing marital violence with a credible exit option. Land ownership creates a means of production of both income and power. A study performed in Kerala, India examined the effects of property status and the likelihood of violence against women. Close to 500 women were surveyed about a number of happenings in the household such as the amount of longterm and current violence that occurred, women's ownership of the land or house, and other sociodemographic characteristics. The violence that occurs can be physical, such as hitting or kicking or psychological, such as threats or belittlement. Long-term violence, or violence that had been occurring throughout the entirety of the marriage, was experienced by 41% of women in rural households, while 27% of urban household women reported violence in various forms. Current violence, or violence occurring within 12 months of the time of survey was experienced by 29% in a physical capacity and 49% experienced psychological violence.

Of all the women surveyed, 35% did not own any property and of that 35%, 49% experienced physical violence while 84% experienced psychological violence. The amount of violence was significantly lower in households where women owned land or property. According to this particular study, women's access to land and property ownership reduces the risk of spousal abuse by enhancing the livelihood of women as well as providing an escape route and means for survival if abuse begins. In many developing countries, where marital violence is prominent, barriers such as unequal laws and social and administrative bias keep women from owning land and property. A vast number of women are left out of owning immovable property (land or house) furthering their likelihood of experiencing marital violence. It can also be argued that land rights greatly shape an individual's relationship with nature and the environment.

=== Relationship between violence of nature and women ===
The WED debate has examined the correlation between the degradation of the environment and the subordination of women. Carolyn Merchant and Vandana Shiva wrote that there is a connection between dominance of women and dominance of nature. Shiva said, "The rupture within nature and between man and nature, and its associated transformation from a life-force that sustains to an exploitable resource characterizes the Cartesian view which has displaced more ecological world-views and created a development paradigm which cripples nature and woman simultaneously". Exploitation of women's labor as well as the abuse of natural environment are connected as they are both marginalized within the economy. Both the environment and women have been viewed as exploitable resources that are significantly undervalued. This argument supports ecofeminism in that women in developing countries rely on nature to survive, therefore, destruction of the environment results in elimination of women's method to survival. According to Jiggins, environmental degradation effects women the most, furthering the inequalities between men and women. One study showed that new developments in technology and developments in land access are denied to women, furthering their subordination and inequality.

== Theoretical perspectives ==
Global changes affect all human lives; some researchers and activists believe that there is no difference between women and men in how they are affected by these changes. Although some of them believe that the difference between women and men is in their biology, many believes the differences are rooted in a diverse array of cultural and social interpretations of biological differences. There are five major streams of feminism, each addressing these distinctions from a unique perspective:

1. Ecofeminist: posits closeness of the relationship between women and environment in the context of patriarchy.
2. Feminist environmentalist: emphasizes the gendered interest in particular resources based on their responsibilities.
3. Socialist feminist: integrates gender into the political economy by using production to distinguish gender roles in economic systems.
4. Feminist poststructuralist: explains gender and environment as manifestations of knowledge which is shaped by different dimensions of identity and demography.
5. Environmental: treats women as both participants and partners in environmental protection and conservation program.

=== Ecofeminism ===
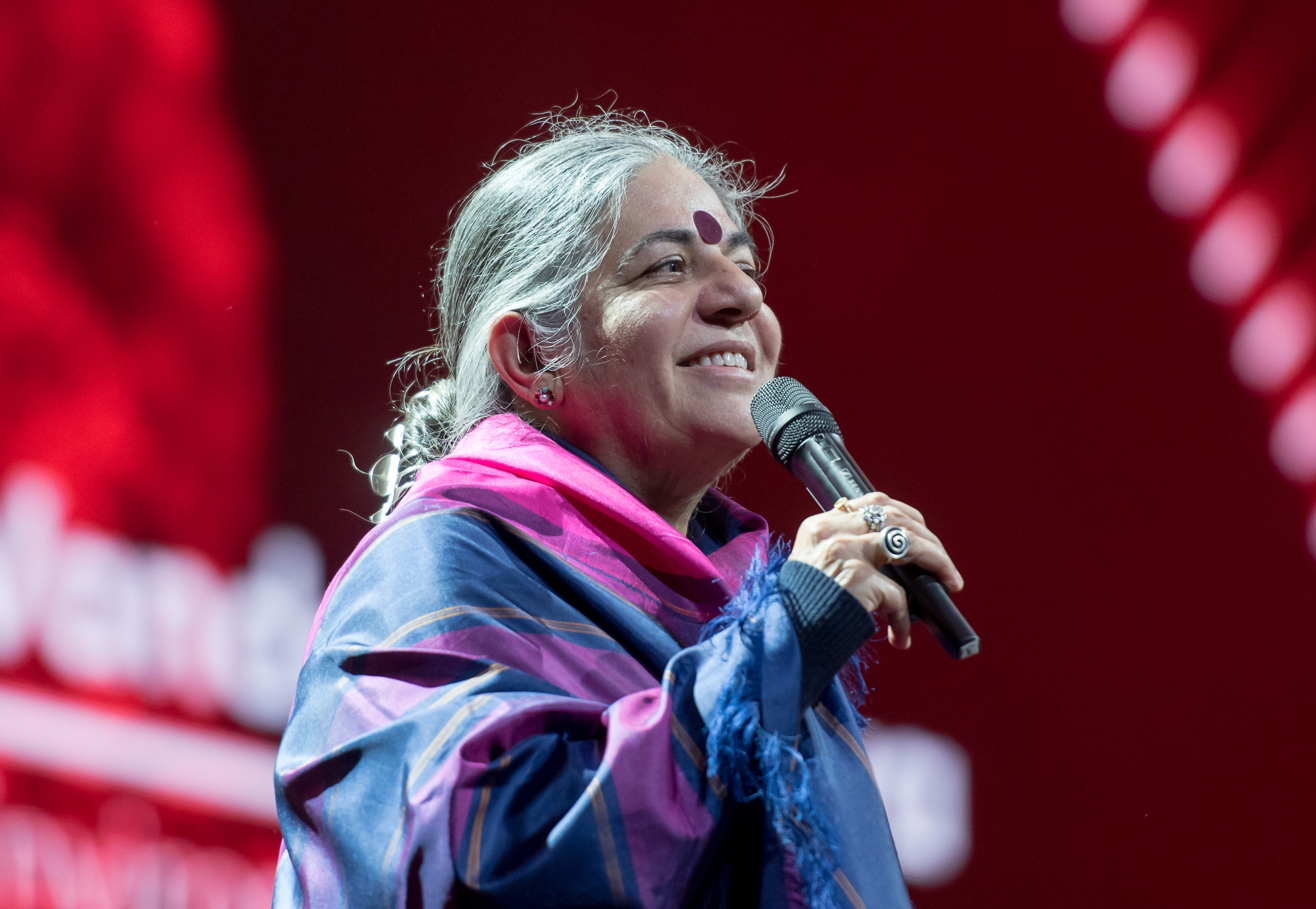
Vandana Shiva speaking at the Global Citizen Festival in Hamburg, Germany.

Ecofeminism postulates that the subordination, oppression, and domination of both women and the environment are similar in structure. Ecofeminism encompasses a variety of views but has a focus of patriarchal oppression and the social constructions relating to women and the environment. Some indicate the biology of women as the reason behind the connection between women and environment, while others credit culture and historical factors. This closeness, as understood by some theorists, makes women more nurturing and caring towards their environment. An ecofeminist believes in a direct connection between oppression of nature and the subordination of women. Vandana Shiva, is credited with bringing ecofeminism into public consciousness by her reports of the Chipko movement.

The Chipko movement also led to the formation of anti alcoholism.

=== Environmental or ecological feminism ===
Environmental or ecological feminism differs from ecofeminism in that it is more focused on the actual, specific interactions with the environment. Connections between environment and gender can be made by looking at the gender division of labor and environmental roles rather than an inherent connection with nature. The gender division of labor requires a more nurturing and caring role for women, therefore that caring nature places women closer with the environment. The knowledge of nature is shaped by the experiences an individual has. Women have a distinct knowledge of the land, yet are excluded from policy decisions of development on that land. This is prominent in many developing countries where the responsibility of collecting fuel and fodder is placed upon the women. Both the resources and the meanings are taken into consideration with environmental feminism. There is a challenge to not only focus on the gender division of labor but also the actual appropriation methods of the resources. In other words, there is not simply an inherent connection between women and nature, rather there are material realities that exist. Bina Agarwal opposes ecofeminism and outlines three problematic elements which are:

- Historical characterization of the situation of women and nature
- Linking of the emancipation of women with that of nature
- Assumptions about women's agency

==== Criticism ====
Bina Agarwal has critiqued the ideas of environmental feminism. She proposes problems with welfare, efficiency, and source of land.

- Welfare

Due to gender differences in income-spending patterns, women are at a higher risk of living in poverty. For this reason, access to land is of special importance. Land access allows for a number of production advantages such as growing trees, fodder and/or crops. But, land access also allows for increased credit, bargaining power and strengthens aggregate real wages rates. Even the smallest amount of land can have huge impacts on welfare directly as well as increasing entitlement to family welfare.

- Efficiency
1. Incentive effect: If women are given secure land rights, there will be a greater incentive for higher production rates. Women will be motivated to use the best technologies, increase cultivation, and make long-term investments. Environmentally sound use of the land resource and reduced out-migration to cities by women and their dependents are other benefits of women's secure land rights.
2. Credit and input access effect: "Titles would enhance women's ability to raise production by improving their access to agricultural credit, as well as by increasing women's independent access to output, savings and cash flow for reinvestment".
3. Efficiency of resource use effect: Studies have shown the possibility that women use resources more efficiently than men. This could mean anything from making a more productive use of loans of money earned to the ability of women to achieve higher values of output based on cropping patterns.
4. Gender specific knowledge and talent pool effect: Many women have specific and often greater knowledge about certain crops and planting patterns. If women are included as farm managers, a more diverse and talented informed pool will be created.
5. Bargaining power and empowerment effect: Providing women with the opportunity to own land will increase their sense of empowerment and could help women to assert themselves more in various situations such as policy creation other government schemes.
- Source of land

Because public land available for distribution is now quite limited, most of the land will need to come from private sectors. "To get a share of land, therefore, it is critical for women to stake a claim in privatised land".

=== Feminist political ecology ===
These frameworks construct a feminist political ecology that is different from political ecology in examining the importance of gender. In contrast, political ecology focuses on access to the resources based on class and ethnicity without considering gender roles. In the authors' view, feminist political ecology must address the following concerns:

1. Women's roles as producers, reproducers, and consumers made them to have combined roles in household, community, and landscape. Specialized science that concentrates on one aspect mostly drops women's ability to integrate daily experiences.
2. Women worldwide are mostly responsible for providing basic household's daily needs, and thus women may suffer more from the lack of subsistence.
3. Ecology and health also have daily and ordinary aspects that are responsive to the feminist viewpoint even though they have become highly technical.
4. While formal science relies on heavy fragmentations, many women have expressed a holistic point of view toward environmental and health issues.
5. Most feminist criticism about science is summarized in inequity of participation, abuse of women in science, universality assumption, use of gendered metaphors, lack of women's everyday experience in ways of learning.Feminist political ecologists discovered that environmental management research is mostly on women. It may cause neglect of men's dominant roles in environmental resources management and put pressure on women. In the communities that men consider breadwinners and women are expected to be caregivers, men have an opportunity to form social capital based on their gender; they socialize, communicate, support each other and build trust in these social groups. Feminist political ecology seeks to discover the role and place of women in environmental development on a political scale.

Feminist political ecology builds from ecofeminism and environmental feminism and lays out three essential factors which are:

1. Gendered knowledge, or the ways in which access to scientific and ecological knowledge is structured by gender (this is considered part of gender feminism).
2. Gendered environmental rights and responsibilities, including differential access by men and women to various legal and de facto claims to land and resources.
3. Gendered politics and grassroots activism, including an examination of women within and as leaders of environmental movements.

== In developed nations ==
=== Sweden ===
Sweden has historically had a political culture that inherently protects the environment. Like in other developed nations, women in Sweden have been empowered to protect the environment through the government and policies.

Sweden is one of the highest-ranking countries when assessing gender equality, though the government does agree there is room for improvement. In Sweden, the majority of local government workers are women at 64%. Since the 2010 election, women comprise 45% of the Swedish parliament. The government has recognized that women are the most affected by climate change and environmental degradation, and have committed to contribute to increasing the participation for women in decisions and policy debates surrounding climate change and other environmental issues. They also have committed to increasing resources for women in civil society who present issues about the environment, hoping to increase accountability and transparency. Peterson and Merchant draw on the idea that the women's environmental movement in Sweden was based on both symbolic and political perspectives. In the early stages of the environmental movement and women's movement in Sweden, women were aware that changes had to be made both within society and ideologies, then enacted politically to create a cohesive collective society.

Elin Wagner (1882–1949) presented herself as a radical feminist in early movements. Wagner was a writer, journalist, environmentalist, ecologist and pacifist. In her writings, she addressed what she saw as a significant flaw in the popular ideology after World War II: that men had the ability to control and conserve nature for the entire global community. Her novel Alarm Clock was barely noticed when released in 1941, but during Sweden's women's movement in the 1970s, her messages became a driving force behind the movement. She believed that there should be a large presence of intellectuals in social movements. Wagner and other key Swedish feminist scholars and intellectuals of that time shaped the parameters of Swedish thinking and both the environmental and women's movements. Throughout her life, Wagner stressed the importance of nature and the environment.

Sweden has it ingrained in both their identity and traditions to have a deep sense of nature, which has played a role in shaping the overall consensus of the country to protect the environment. Through the transformation of the opinion and ideologies of the Swedish people, it became much easier to entrench environmental policies. Women working within institutions protected the global environment by pushing for bans on nuclear energy or industry degrading local environment. In 1980, there was a national referendum on nuclear power in Sweden. The voting patterns revealed that 43% of women were against nuclear power, while only 21% of men opposed it. Sweden and the women of the country have demonstrated that environmental protection can be achieved through transitioning ideologies followed by institutional change.

=== United States ===
Women's involvement in the environmental movements of the United States can be traced back to the early 20th century when women of upper and middle-class backgrounds became active in urban organizations advocating for reform in environmental issues such as sanitation, smoke and noise abatement, civic cleanliness and purity in food and drugs. Female activists of this period included Alice Hamilton, Jane Addams, and Ellen Swallow Richards who brought to the forefront issues of pollution, urban degradation and health hazards. Rose Schneiderman, a labor activist, advocated for the cleanup of hazardous work environments during this period as well. During the eras of World War I, the Great Depression and World War II the United States saw a period of inactivity on environmental issues. It was not until 1962, with the publication of Silent Spring, written by Rachel Carson, denouncing the U.S. government's use of pesticides and the nation's increase in industrial waste, that women in the United States returned to environmental issues. The book is considered one of the seminal pieces of environmental works written. The 1970s found women actively engaging in environmental issues. W.A.R.N. (Women of All Red Nations) was formed by Native American women to combat the environmental and health effects of uranium mining on native lands. Lesbian women formed communal spaces, returning to living on the land, recycling materials, using solar power and growing organic foods in their efforts to combat industrial pollution and degradation of natural resources.

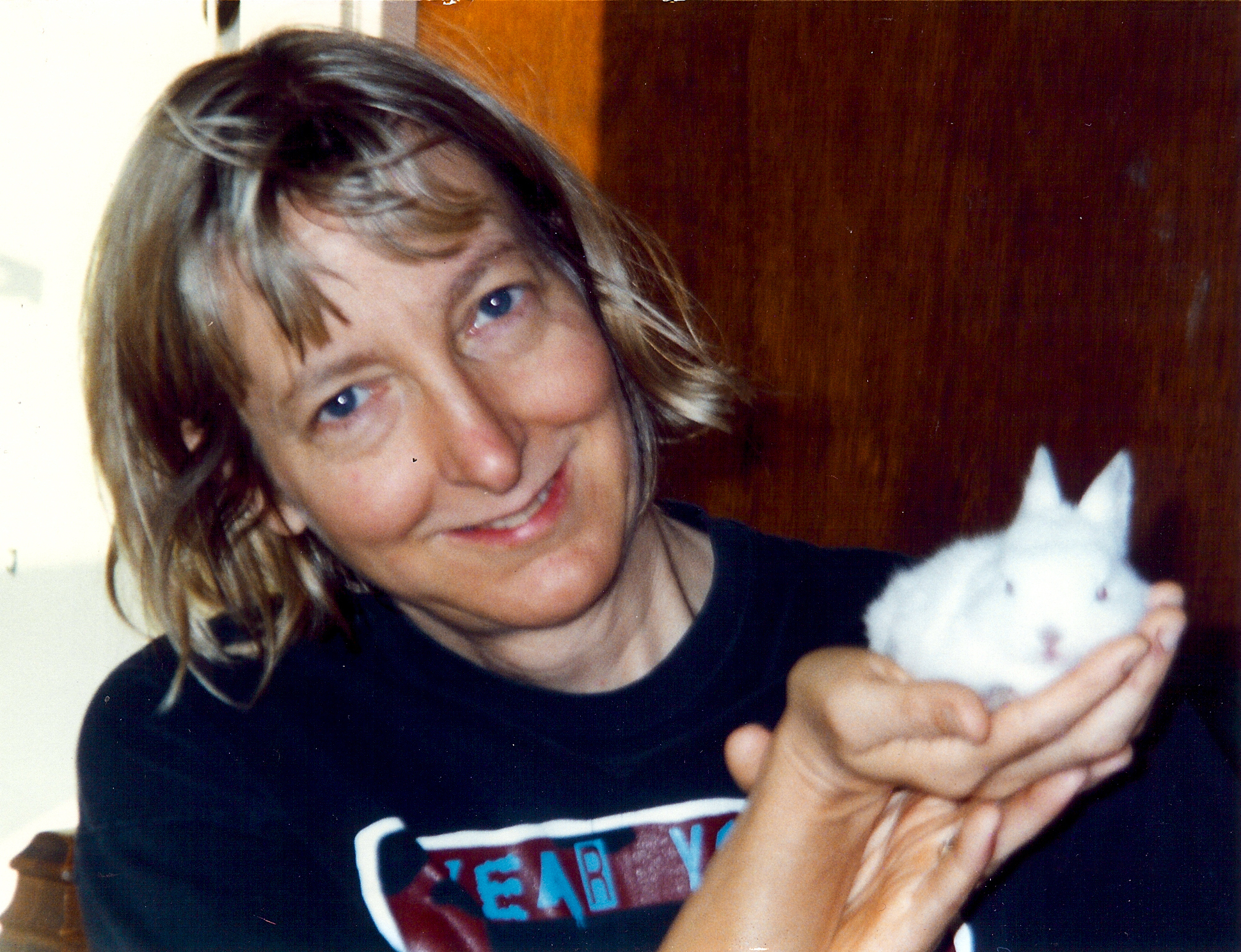
Photo of Carol Adams with Snowball the Bunny.

The 1980s was an important decade for women in the environment. In 1980 the term 'ecofeminism' was born. In April 1980, the conference "Women and Life on Earth: Ecofeminism in the 1980's", the first in a series of conferences on ecofeminism, was held in Amherst, MA. In November 1980, the Women's Pentagon Action took place in Washington, D.C., when the group "Women and Life on Earth" gathered to protest war, militarism, nuclear weapons and the effects on the environment. At its core, ecofeminism recognizes the link between the oppression of women and the oppression of nature. The liberation of women and nature are linked and it is towards this end that ecofeminists work. Inherent to this concept is sexism. Australian ecofeminist Ariel Kay Salleh was an early critic of deep ecologists of this time claiming that most of its spokespersons were male and therefore were afraid to confront the naturism and sexism causing environmental crises. Carol Adams furthered this ideology with her work The Sexual Politics of Meat in which she established the link between sexual objectification of women to the consumption of animals as objects of food.

Environmental issues continued to dominate women's activism work in the 1980s with the publication of Judith Plant's Healing the Wounds: the Promise of Ecofeminism, the first North American anthology of ecofeminism, in 1989. In June 1989, the Ecofeminist Caucus of the National Women's Studies Association was formed. The second half of the decade saw the emergence of American socialist ecofeminists, Karen Warren and Carolyn Merchant. Warren's work was instrumental in defining the four core principles of ecofeminism; the connections between women and nature, the need for the understanding of those connections, that feminist theory and perspective must include ecological perspectives and that ecological solutions must come from a feminist perspective. Socialist ecofeminists are concerned with issues impacting the environment resulting from the intersection of oppression by race, class or gender. Specific issues addressed by socialist ecofeminists are colonialism, multinational corporate development of the South, global distribution of wealth, overpopulation and the critique of biotechnology.

Since the 1990s, women have continued to foster their concerns of the environment in the United States. The decade saw the growth of the Environmental Justice movement beginning with Lois Gibbs, who formed the Center for Health, Environment and Justice, helping community organizations battle toxic waste issues and others. The Principles of Environmental Justice were adopted at the First National People of Color Environmental Leadership Summit in Washington, D.C., on October 24–27, 1991. In a series of seventeen mandates, the principles call for public policies guaranteeing the right to responsible uses of renewable resources and land, creating a sustainable planet for all living beings. Feminists involved in current ecological movements continue the examination of the intersectionality of race, class and gender in human's experiences within their environments and the examination of perceptions and how values of the connection between humans and the environment are shaped by gender roles and assumptions. Other topics of concern include structures of power at the political and economic institutional level that are instrumental in the ecological movement, particularly the interdependence between oppression and domination. Today's environmental feminists' scholarship focuses upon transnational, post-structuralist and postcolonial deconstructions.

During the 2000s, women turned their focus to gender justice, another aspect of the environmental justice movement. Gender justice differs from ecofeminism in that this perspective argues that women are affected by the environment in gender-specific ways as opposed to the focus on the connection between the oppression of women and nature. Gender disparities for women include the increase of environmental burdens due to their involvement in women's work of care taking and lack of access to resources due to lower incomes or poverty. Women are more likely to make food sacrifices for their family, and are more impacted by climate change, which impacts at a greater risk those that are already environmentally disadvantaged. Women are at greater risk during natural disasters, and subjected to increased levels of male violence in the wake of these disasters. Overall, women are less likely to be able to avoid or adapt to environmental degradation. The response to these gender inequities has been an increase in activism by women of color. In a marked difference from mainstream environmentalists, women of color, primarily Native American and Hispanic, are driving political change using grassroots organizations in a desire to address the gender specific differences of environmental effects. Gender justice activists also seek to empower their communities and preserve their cultural traditions in addition to preserving the environment. Following these principles, environmental leaders such as activist Julia Butterfly Hill, founder of the Circle of Life Foundation, and Native American activist Winona LaDuke (Anishinabe), founder of Indigenous Women's Network, are continuing women's participation in the environmental gender justice movement in the United States today.

Women have had a longstanding impact on the environment in the United States, with efforts being shaped by larger feminist movements. In the early 20th century, women's involvement in the ecological movements grew out of the social feminist work that occurred in between the first and second waves of feminism. Ecofeminism stems from the second wave of radical feminism that was prevalent in the 1960s and 1970s. Environmental justice and gender justice arose from the feminist move towards intersectionality of race, class, and gender in the 1990s. As feminists continue to examine these issues, the environment and women's roles pertaining to it will continue to be topics of concern.

=== International ===
The Intergovernmental Panel on Climate Change (IPCC) is one of the largest and most dominating scientific voice regarding climate change since 1990 when the first paper was published. Since then, there has been studies investigating the demographics of the authors of IPCC and the results are as follows: the dominating demographics are authors from developed countries, nonindigenous voices and men.

Focusing on the woman contributors, during the time of the initial publishing in 1990, around 12 female authors participated. This has increased significantly since then; the most recent IPCC paper was published in 2013 and it was reported that 182 of the authors were women.

What these women experienced when contributing to this paper varied, but many expressed that what is included in the report is controlled by a few scientists as well as the overall workload being unfair. Though our women authors felt they could write freely in their individual chapters, they believed they had little say in the overall content of the report.

Some women expressed they had a pleasant experience when working on the IPCC report, while others felt they were not heard and faced obstacles their peers did not encounter. These barriers transcended their gender and targeted their race, nationality, being a native English speaker and their discipline.

== Women's attitude and the environment ==
In recent decades, environmental movements have increased as the movements for women's rights have also increased. Today's union of nature preservation with women's rights and liberation has stemmed from invasion of their rights in the past.

In developing areas of the world, women are considered the primary users of natural resources (land, forest, and water), because they are the ones who are responsible for gathering food, fuel, and fodder. Although women mostly cannot own the land and farms outright in these countries, they spend most of their time working on the farms to feed the household. Although technological inputs increase male involvement with land, many of them leave the farm to go to cities to find jobs, so women become increasingly responsible for an increasing portion of farm tasks. Shouldering this responsibility leads them to learn more about soil, plants, and trees and not misuse them. These rural women tend to have a closer relationship with land and other natural resources, which promotes a new culture of respectful use and preservation of natural resources and the environment, ensuring that the following generations can meet their needs.

Besides considering how to achieve appropriate agricultural production and human nutrition, women want to secure access to the land. Women's perspectives and values for the environment are somewhat different from men's. Women give greater priority to protection of and improving the capacity of nature, maintaining farming lands, and caring for nature and environment's future. Repeated studies have shown that women have a stake in environment, and this stake is reflected in the degree to which they care about natural resources.

== Climate change ==
=== Population ===
One of the biggest drivers of climate change is population growth. The world's population is set to reach 10 billion by the end of the 21st century, putting a strain on resources such as water supplies, food, and energy. To accommodate this growth in population, it is estimated that almost 40% more food, 40% more water and 50% more energy is necessary. Projections for the future are based on data from past years, such as the period from 1950 to 1960 when the developing world's population doubled, increasing from three billion to over six billion by 2000. Niger is projected to go from 15 million to 80 million by 2050, alongside Afghanistan, which is anticipated to go from 30 million to 82 million. This population growth, coupled with consumption and waste will have large effects on ecosystems and communities. With an increase in population, there is also projection for an increase in emissions, effects of industrialization, contributing to climate change. Some argue that the third world is not responsible for the brunt of climate change as the first world is using more resources, which is more impactful on climate change.

Population growth is influenced by women's education. Education of women with information and access to birth control are key factors that influence population. Education for women leads to few children, has been seen to improve health and reduce mortality, affecting the global population outlook. In addition, according to Wolfgang, there is literature and research surrounding the idea that education leads to better health and income, changing thinking and attitudes around jobs with an emphasis on social and economic opportunities instead of family size. The idea of using education as a means of controlling population in developing countries is questioned, along with the discourse around 'third world' women requiring 'intervention' and excessively reproducing.

The subsequent response to the connection between women and climate change has evoked multiple responses in the policy realm. Policy makers have shifted policy to reflect gender sensitive frameworks to address climate change. Arora-Jonsson argues that by focusing on the vulnerability of women in relation to climate change, it places more responsibility on women and shifts the narrative to ignore the root causes of the issue, power relations and institutional inequality. The outcome of UN movements and policies for promoting women in areas impacted by climate change such as agriculture have not been scientifically proven to have any beneficial results on women communities.

=== Women-led climate projects ===
There are many climate projects with women at the forefront.

Women in Climate

Founded by Stephanie Holthaus in 2018, the vision for Women in Climate (WIC) is to unite and support all women driving equitable solutions to climate change. This is a subgroup of another organization called The Nature Conservancy, a global environmental nonprofit with the hopes of creating a world where people and life can thrive.

Nous Sommes la Solution

Also referred to as We Are the Solution in English, this movement was started in 2011 by twelve women's organizations from West Africa. This group of women strive to promote good practices and agricultural knowledge, advocate for family farming and influence decision makers regarding agricultural management.

Indonesia Women's Earth Alliance Grassroots Accelerator

Founded in 2019, this program's goal is to initiate and accelerate the efforts of women in Indonesia who are leaders in the mission to protect their communities from negative impacts of climate change. This is a four-month program geared towards these leaders and offer them the ability to hone, and refine their skills and solidify any future plans to be drafted and initiated within their individual organizations.

== Gender and perception of the environment ==
Given the environmental degradation caused while men have had dominance over women, and women's large investment in environmental sustainability, some have theorized that women would protect the Earth better than men if in power. Although there is no evidence for this hypothesis, recent movements have shown that women are more sensitive to the earth and its problems. They have created a special value system about environmental issues. People's approaches to environmental issues may depend on their relationship with nature. Both women and nature have been considered as subordinates entities by men throughout history, which conveys a close affiliation between them.

Historically, the perception of the natural environment between men and women differs. As an example, rural Indian women collect the dead branches which are cut by storm for fuel wood to use rather than cutting the live trees. Since African, Asian, and Latin American women use the land to produce food for their family, they acquire the knowledge of the land/soil conditions, water, and other environmental features. Any changes in the environment, like deforestation, have the greatest negative effects on women of that area until they can cope with these changes. One example would be the Nepali women whose grandmothers had to climb to the mountain to be able to bring in wood and fodder.

An example of female prominence in the defense of natural forests comes from India in 1906. As forest clearing was expanding conflict between loggers and government and peasant communities increased. To thwart resistance to the forest clearing, the men were diverted from their villages to a fictional payment compensation site and loggers were sent to the forests. The women left in the villages, however, protested by physically hugging themselves to the trees to prevent their being cut down, giving rise to what is now called the Chipko movement, an environmentalist movement initiated by these Indian women (which also is where the term tree-huggers originated). This conflict started because men wanted to cut the trees to use them for industrial purposes while women wanted to keep them since it was their food resource and deforestation was a survival matter for local people.

== Women environmentalists ==
=== Mei Ng ===
Mei Ng was born in Hong Kong, China and she received her B.A. in anthropology from the University of California, Berkeley, in 1972 and has worked diligently to promote environmental awareness throughout China. Mei Ng is an advocate of responsible consumption, renewable energy utilization, and sustainable development through the women and youth of China, and works to mobilize women to defend the environment and to bring environmental education to all parts of China. She previously held the position of Director for Friends of the Earth (HK) in Hong Kong, an environmental organization which seeks to encourage environmental protection in China.

In 2001, she was appointed to the Advisory Council on the Environment. In 2002, Mei Ng was elected to the United Nations Global 500 Roll of Honor on World Environment Day. Also in 2002, she was appointed by the Chinese State Environmental Protection Agency as China Environment Envoy. In 2003, the Hong Kong SAR Government awarded her the Bronze Bauhinia Star, and in 2004, she was appointed to become a member of the Harbour Enhancement Committee. She founded the Earth Station, Hong Kong's first renewable energy education center, which has been well received by policy makers and citizens alike.

=== Vandana Shiva ===
Vandana Shiva was born on November 5, 1952, in India. Vandana Shiva has a B.S. in physics, a M.A. in philosophy from the University of Guelph (Ontario, Canada) and received her Ph.D. from the University of Western Ontario in Quantum Theory Physics. Vandana Shiva is an environmental scholar and activist who campaigns for women in India as well as around the world. As a physicist-environmentalist adhering to ecofeminism, Vandana Shiva has published numerous papers on the unequal burden placed on women by environmental degradation, stating that women and children "bore the costs but were excluded from the benefits" of development. Vandana Shiva is also an active voice for localized, organic agriculture. She began a movement entitled Navdanya where participating Indian farmers have created 'freedom zones' to revitalize an organic food market in India. She has received many honorary degrees awards. In 1993 she received the Right Livelihood Award. In 2010 Sydney Peace Prize and in 2011 she received the Calgary Peace Prize. In addition, Vandana Shiva was named "one of the 7 most influential women in the world" by Forbes.

=== Wangari Muta Maathai ===
In 1940 Wangari Maathai was born in Nyeri, Kenya. She attended Mount St. Scholastica College in Kansas and received her degree in biological sciences in 1964. This was a part of the 1960 'Kennedy Airlift' which brought 300 Kenyans (including Barack Obama's father Barack Obama, Sr.) to the United States to study at American universities. She then obtained her M.S. from University of Pittsburgh in 1966 and her Ph.D. from the University of Nairobi. She was the first woman in East and Central Africa to earn a doctorate degree. Wangari Maathai was an advocate for human rights, preaching the necessity for democracy. Her passion for environmental conservation lead her to found the Greenbelt Movement in 1977. Wangari Maathai's personal life was turbulent with divorce and jailings, as well as constant confrontations with the Kenyan government. Her push to protect national land from development made her less than favorable to Kenyan president Daniel arap Moi, who served from 1978 to 2002. In 2004, Wangari Maathai received the Nobel Peace Prize, making her the first African woman to win. On September 25, 2011, Wangari Maathai died of ovarian cancer. BBC World News noted this as a 'Death of Visionary'.

=== Maria Cherkasova ===
Maria Cherkasova (b. 1938) is a Russian journalist, ecologist, and director of Centre for Independent Ecological Programmers (CIEP). She is known for coordinating a 4-year campaign to stop construction of hydro-electric dam on the Katun River. After Cherkasova's involvement in the student movement on environmental protection in the 1960s, she began to work for the Red Data Book for the Department of Environmental Protection Institute. She researched and preserved rare species until she became the editor of USSR Red Data Book. She co-founded the Socio-Ecological Union, which has become the largest ecological NGO in the former Soviet Union. In 1990, she became director of CIEP, which arrange and drives activities in an extensive range of ecologically related areas on both domestic and international fronts. Cherkasova recently has shifted her focus on protecting children's rights to live in a healthy environment and speaks for them both inside and outside Russia.

=== Rachel Carson ===
Rachel Carson (1907–1964) was an American scientist, writer, and ecologist. Rachel Carson went to the Pennsylvania College for Women, majoring in English, but she was inspired by her biology teacher so she switched her major to biology. She became more interested and focused on the sea while she was working at the Marine Biological Laboratories in Massachusetts. Her eloquent prose let to the publication of her first book, Under the Sea-Wind: a Naturalists' Picture of Ocean Life, in 1941. In 1949 she became chief editor of the Fish and Wildlife Service (FWS). Her second book, The Sea Around Us, won the National Book Award and sold more than 200,000 copies.

After that she retired from FWS and became a full-time writer. After her third and final book about the sea, The Edge of the Sea, Carson focused on effects of chemicals and pesticides on the environment. That is when she wrote her book about environment, Silent Spring. The book was about what man has done to the nature and eventually to himself, and started a modern environmental movement. Carson believed that humanity and nature are mutually dependent on each other. She argued that industrial activities such as pesticides use can damages the earth ecosystem and will have far-reaching ecological consequences such as future human health problems. Today, scientific studies have demonstrated these consequences.

=== Jane Goodall ===
Jane Goodall (b. 1934) is a female environmentalist most well known for her chimpanzee study, in which she lived among the primates. She became interested in animals as a young child and spent her early adulthood saving money to fund her dream of taking a trip to Africa. Her position as secretary to Louis Leakey led to her participation in several anthropological digs and animal studies, and eventually she was selected to study chimpanzee behavior in Tanzania. She made several discoveries about the behavior of chimpanzees on these studies and is credited with discovering the chimpanzee behavior of eating meat and creating tools. She published a book about the study entitled In the Shadow of Man. She is also known for her activism, promoting the preservation of wild chimpanzee environments and opposing the use of animals in research. She has received numerous awards for her achievements and runs the Jane Goodall Institute for Wildlife Research, Education, and Conservation, a nonprofit organization.

=== Dr. Sandra Steingraber ===
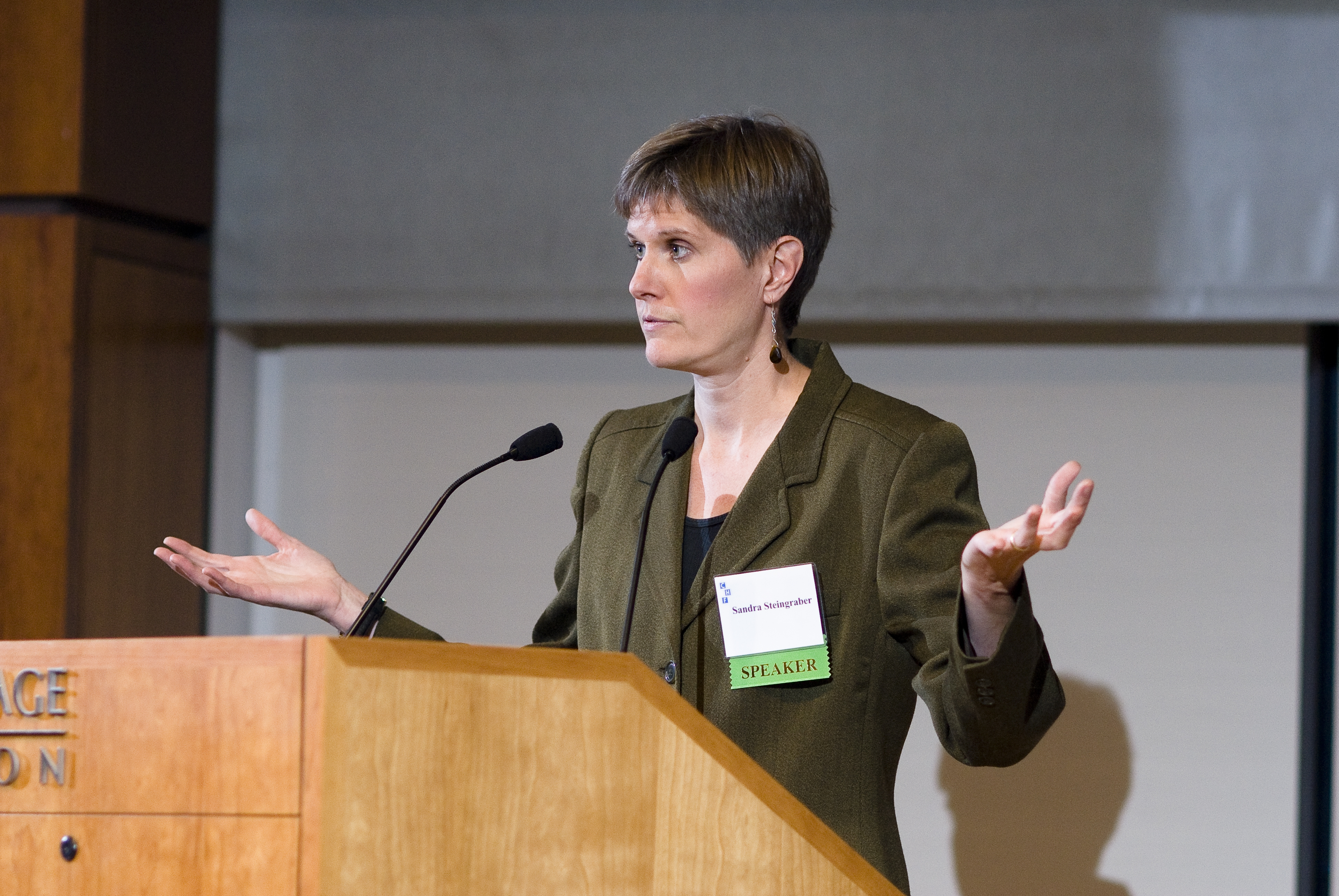
Photograph of Dr. Sandra Steingraber, taken at the Molecules in Motion Lecture on Nov 11th, 2011 at the Chemical Heritage Foundation.

Dr. Sandra Steingraber, a distinguished scientist based in the United States, has made significant contributions to the field of biology as an author and activist. During her academic tenure, she drew inspiration from Rachel Carson, who served as a pivotal influence in her studies. She also battled bladder during this time, which went into remission allowing her to continue her education. Following her educational pursuits, Dr. Steingraber became actively involved in environmental advocacy. Notably, in March 2013, she protested against the industrialization of the Finger Lakes region.

In the subsequent year, she participated in a campaign known as the civil disobedience campaign. Both instances of activism resulted in her arrest. Presently, Dr. Steingraber continues to contribute to the field through her writings and lectures, focusing on the environmental factors affecting reproductive health and the correlation between cancer and the air, water, and food we consume.

== Ecological movements initiated by women ==
=== Chipko movement ===
One of the first environmentalist movements led by women was the Chipko movement (women tree-huggers in India). Its name comes from a Hindi word meaning "to stick" (as in glue).

After the Indian Government granted an order for sport equipments to a local company of Utrakhand, India, the Maharajah of Jodhpur wanted to build a new palace in Rajasthan, which is India's Himalayan foothills. While the axemen were cutting the trees, martyr Amrita Devi hugged one of the trees. This is because in Jodhpur, each child had a tree that could talk to it. The axmen ignored Devi, and after taking her off the tree, cut it down. Her daughters are environmentalists like Chandi Prasad Bhatt and Sunderlal Bahuguna.

After the state government granted permission to a corporation for commercial logging, the women of the villages resisted, embracing trees to prevent their felling to safeguard their lifestyles, which were dependent on the forests. Deforestation could qualitatively alter the lives of all village residents, but it was the women who agitated for saving the forests. Organized by a non-governmental organization led by Chandi Prasad Bhatt, the Chipko movement adopted the slogan "ecology is permanent economy". The women embracing the trees did not tag their action as feminist activism; however, "as a movement that demonstrated resistance against oppression, it had all the markings of such."

=== Green Belt movement ===
Another movement, which is one of the biggest in women's and environmental history, is the Green Belt movement. Nobel Prize winner Wangari Maathai founded this movement on the World Environment Day in June 1977. The starting ceremony was very simple: a few women planted seven trees in Maathai's backyard. By 2005, 30 million trees had been planted by participants in the Green Belt movement on public and private lands. The Green Belt movement aims to bring environmental restoration along with society's economic growth. This movement led by Maathai focused on restoration of Kenya's rapidly diminishing forests as well as empowering the rural women through environmental preservation, with a special emphasis on planting indigenous trees.

=== Navdanya Movement ===
Navdanya also known as the 'Nine Seeds Movement' seeks to empower local Indian farmers to move away from growing any genetically modified organism (GMOs) on their land and return to organic, chemical-free practices. This movement has reached over 5,000,000 Indian farmers and created over 65 seed banks around India. Navdanya fights to eliminate the commercialization of indigenous knowledge also known as 'biopiracy'. Navdanya addresses multiple other international issues including climate change, food security, misapplication of technology, food sovereignty, fair trade, and many others. This movement also created a learning center entitled Bija Vidyapeeth. Bija Vidyapeeth, in collaboration with Schumacher College in the United Kingdom, seeks to educate participants in sustainability and ecological principles.

=== Kenyan land takeover ===
In Kenya, starting in the mid-1980s, women protested against the elites and big foreign corporations who were coercing and controlling the production of the land. Rather than allowing food to be grown for survival, women were pressured by both their husbands and the government to cultivate coffee for foreign profit. Protests continued and gained strength over the next couple of decades. The protests eventually ended in a Kenyan power shift enforcing democratic national elections which resulted in redistribution of land possible.

=== Dakota Access Pipeline protests ===
The Dakota Access Pipeline protests (also known by the hashtag campaign #NoDAPL) was an opposition to the construction of the Dakota Access Pipeline. The Dakota Access Pipeline is 1,172 miles long, traveling from North to South Dakota and has the capability of transporting thousands of barrels of oil. The pipeline runs under Lake Oahe, an important water source for the Standing Rock Reservation located near the projected site in South Dakota. In 2016 construction was set to begin but was soon halted by the opposition the project faced. The Standing Rock Reservation claimed that the construction of the pipeline was an environmental injustice and could lead to their water source becoming polluted if the pipeline was to burst. The reservation also claimed that the proposed site that was to be dug was sacred ground and contained buried ancestors. The United States Army Corps of Engineers, who were responsible for approving the permit needed to proceed with construction, claimed that proper assessments had been taken to ensure that it was environmentally and culturally safe to proceed with the completion of the pipeline. With the U.S. Army Corps of Engineers continuing to move forward with construction, the NoDAPL movement was created in April 2016 to try to halt construction of the pipeline in order to protect the Standing Rock Reservation's water source and members. The movement grew historically large due to the threat of pollution and violence against women.

Although the NoDAPL movement was largely labeled as only an environmental justice movement, the NoDAPL movement's concerns were also gendered. The gendered perspective of the NoDAPL movement was told in the documentary, Rise: Standing Rock. Many Standing Rock tribe members claimed that the construction of the pipeline would also lead to an increase of sexual violence against women and girls living on the reservation. Visiting tribe members from the Fort Berthold Reservation shared stories of the danger young girls now faced after the increase of fracking in their community. A Fort Berthold tribe member described how oil workers would pick up young girls walking home within the reservation and kidnap them to be sold amongst the workers for sex.

According to the book, The Beginning and End of Rape: Confronting Sexual Violence in Native America, Indigenous women are more likely to experience sexual violence than any other ethnic groups. Although there are many factors that contribute to those high numbers in a 2013 article, Genevieve Le May stated that the increase of oil extraction sites and pipelines near reservations is a big contributing factor due to "man camps" built by reservations to house the oil workers. Le May also claims that it is hard for reservations to seek justice for sexual assaults due to lack of police interference. That is why some considered the mobilization of Indigenous people, particularly Indigenous women, in the NoDAPL movement to be historical. Many female tribe members explained that the water coming out of their faucets was water from Lake Oahe. This means that any pollution to the lake would directly affect them and their families since they drink, bathe and cook with the water.

Because this pipeline directly affected their community, participants of the Standing Rock. The movement grew due to support of tribes across the nation, including many members that travelled to Standing Rock Reservation. Due to social media the NoDAPL movement was able to include thousands of supporters from all over the world. The NoDAPL movement included many protests at Standing Rock Reservation and confrontations with police and NoDAPL supporters all throughout 2016. During his last few months in office President Barack Obama responded to the protests by ceasing all construction of the pipeline. The halt of construction was short due to succeeding president, Donald Trump. During the first year of his administration, President Donald Trump ordered for the completion of the Dakota Access Pipeline, which occurred in 2017.

In the article "Living In A Liminal Space: Standing Rock And Storytelling As A Tool Of Activism", author Janelle Cronin states that one of the NoDAPL women leaders that needs recognition is LaDonna BraveBull Allard, a member of the Sioux Tribe of Standing Rock. In 2016 Allard published a video on Facebook asking for the surrounding tribes to come and support Standing Rock in protesting the pipeline, sparking public interest in the NoDAPL movement. In response to people answering her call, Allard created Sacred Stone Camp, which housed protestors for the months that the NoDAPL movement took place.

The VICELAND documentary Rise: Standing Rock showed that Allard provided the camp with food and anything else needed to keep the camp functioning, paying with donations given as well as out of her own pocket. Even though the pipeline has been completed, the Sacred Stone Camp remains. The camp's official website claims that there is still a need to educate people about the importance of a sustainable lifestyle as well as a need to protect water due to threats that still exist globally. Another noticeable leader in the NoDAPL movement is Bobbi Jean Three Legs, another member of the Sioux Tribe.

In her article, Mary Ferguson claims that Bobbi played an important role in keeping the nation's attention on Standing Rock. Bobbie and other young tribe members organized a run that would take them from South Dakota to Washington, D.C. This run was created in order to hand deliver a petition asking the U.S. Army Corps of Engineers to deny the construction of the pipeline through their water source. Bobbi claimed that she became involved with NoDAPL because of her concern for future generations living on the reservation and because she wanted to make sure that clean water would always be available for her daughter.

== See also ==
- Women and animal advocacy
