= The Death of Nature =

1980 book by Carolyn Merchant

The Death of Nature: Women, Ecology and the Scientific Revolution
- Author: Carolyn Merchant
- Language: English
- Subject: Environmental History
- Published: 1980
- Publisher: Harper & Row
- Publication place: United States
- Media type: Print
- Pages: 348
- ISBN: 0062505955

The Death of Nature: Women, Ecology and the Scientific Revolution is a 1980 book by historian Carolyn Merchant. It is one of the first books to explore the Scientific Revolution through the lenses of feminism and ecology. It can be seen as an example of feminist utopian literature of the late 1970s. The author investigates how a historic shift away from seeing Earth as a living organism, and towards seeing it as a machine, was consequently used to justify the domination of both nature and women. Through the exploration of images and metaphors directly linking nature and women, and changing attitudes towards science and technology, the book purports that what was once a need to exercise constraint transformed into a permission for control and exploitation.

The Death of Nature contributed to the development of ecofeminism in the United States in the 1980s, alongside works by authors such as Margot Adler, Mary Daly, Susan Griffin, Charlene Spretnak and Starhawk. It has had a noted impact in the fields of environmental history, philosophy, and feminism for its "unprecedented scholarly attention" to the historical linkages between the feminization of nature and the naturalization of women.
