= Carolyn Merchant =

American ecofeminist

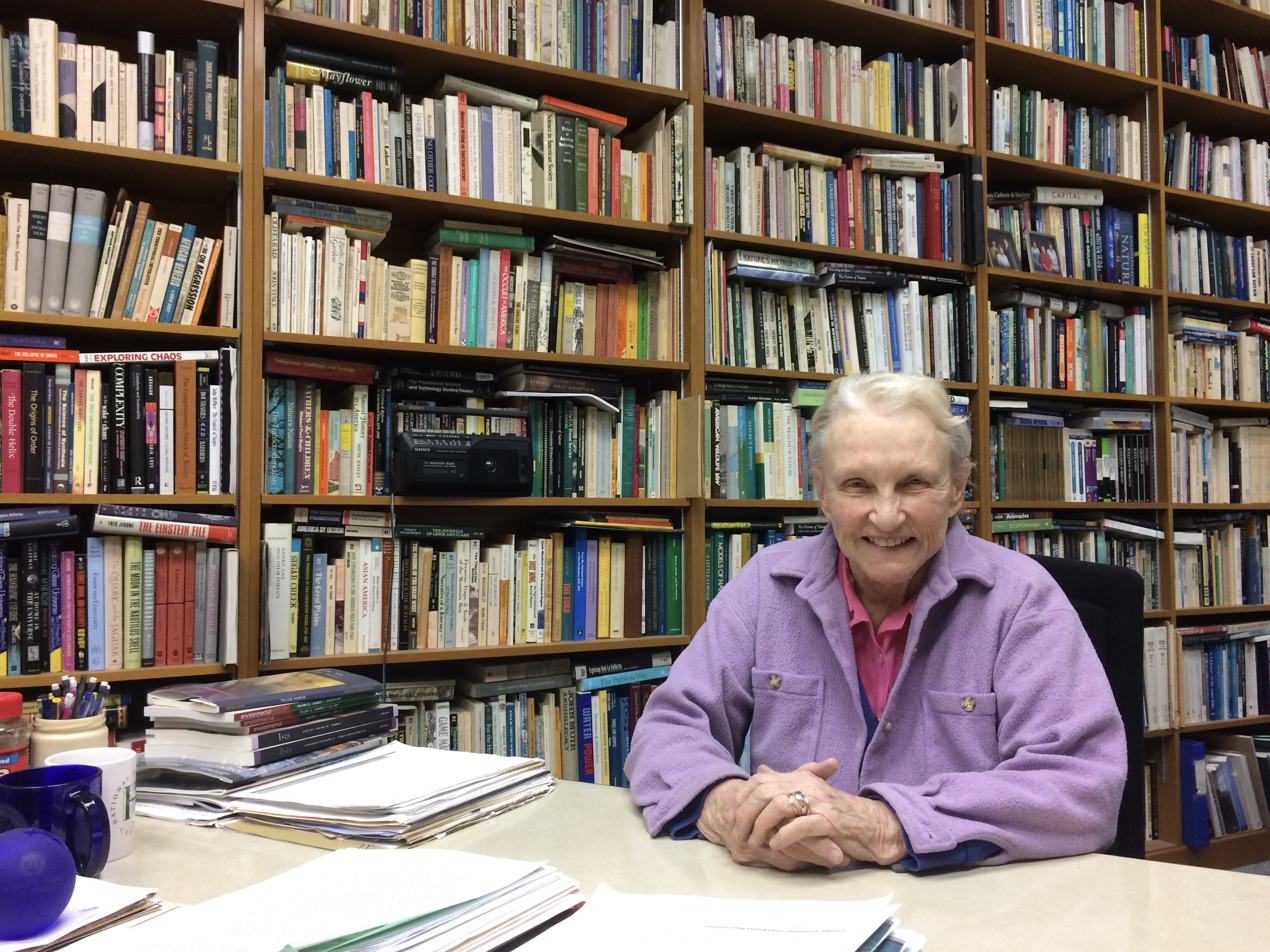
- Born: 12 July 1936 (age 90); Rochester, New York, U.S.
- Education: University of Wisconsin–Madison
- Occupations: Philosopher, historian of science
- Employer: UC Berkeley

Carolyn Merchant (born July 12, 1936) is an American ecofeminist philosopher and historian of science most famous for her theory (and book of the same title) on The Death of Nature, whereby she identifies the Scientific Revolution of the seventeenth century as the period when science began to atomize, objectify, and dissect nature, foretelling its eventual conception as composed of inert atomic particles. Her works are important in the development of environmental history and the history of science. She is Distinguished Professor Emerita of Environmental History, Philosophy, and Ethics at UC Berkeley.

== Education and career ==
In 1954, as a high school senior, Merchant was among the Top Ten Finalists for the Westinghouse Science Talent Search. She received her A.B. in Chemistry from Vassar College in 1958.

She then went to the University of Wisconsin–Madison to earn an M.A. and Ph.D. in the History of Science. There, she was one of the first to be awarded the E. B. Fred Fellowship, to demonstrate that women could make significant contributions to professional fields. In 1963, Merchant, along with 13 other women out of a pool of 114 applicants, was awarded a three-year grant to fund field non-specific graduate research. Her thesis, titled The Controversy over Living Force: Leibniz to D'Alembert, was advised by Erwin N. Heibert.

She was a lecturer in the History of Science, Department of Physics and Natural Sciences Interdisciplinary Program at the University of San Francisco from 1969 to 1974, assistant professor from 1974–76, and associate professor from 1976–78. She was a visiting professor at Oregon State University in the History of Science Department and General Science Department in 1969.

Merchant has been a member of the History of Science Society since 1962. From 1971–1972, she was co-president of the West Coast History of Science Society. She was chair of the Committee on Women of Science from 1973–1974 and co-chair from 1992–1994. She has been a member of the American Society for Environmental History since 1980 and has held positions such as vice-president and president in addition to serving as associate Editor of the Environmental Review and as a member of the Rachel Carson Prize Committee for best dissertation.

In 1984, she was a Fulbright Senior Scholar at the University of Umeå in Umeå, Sweden, where she taught in the Department of History of Ideas.

In 1979, she became Assistant Professor of Environmental History, Philosophy, and Ethics, at the University of California, Berkeley, Associate Professor in 1980, and Full Professor in 1986. She retired in 2018 and since then has been Professor of the Graduate School at UC Berkeley.

Merchant has been a Guggenheim fellow; a Fulbright scholar; a two-time fellow at the Center for Advanced Study in the Behavioral Sciences, Stanford; a fellow at the National Humanities Center, Research Triangle Park, NC; a member of the Institute for Advanced Study, Princeton; and an American Association for the Advancement of Science fellow. She has presented over 360 lectures in the United States, Canada, Europe, Brazil, and Australia. There are over 230 reviews and discussions of books written by Carolyn Merchant.

In 1971 Merchant was one of the first women to be invited to join the exclusive History of Science Dinner Club at Berkeley.

== The Death of Nature ==
The Death of Nature: Women, Ecology and the Scientific Revolution (1st edition, 1980; 2nd edition, 1990; 3rd edition, 2020) is Merchant's most well-known book. In this book, she emphasizes the importance of gender in the historiography of modern science. Additionally, she focuses her book on "the sexist assumptions that informed sixteenth- and seventeenth-century conceptions of the universe and human physiology." Merchant expresses the importance of gender in early modern writing on nature, and the use of environmental, social, and literary history as a context for the history of science.

The book has been translated into the following languages: Japanese (1985), German (1987, 1994, 2020), Italian (1988), Swedish (1994), Chinese (1999), Korean (2005), Spanish (2020), French (2020), and Portuguese (2021). There is also a CD collection read by Juliet Jones for HarperAudio (2020).

== Philosophy ==
Merchant argues that prior to the Scientific Revolution of the seventeenth century, nature was conceived of as the benevolent mother of all things, albeit sometimes wild. This metaphor was gradually replaced by the "domination of nature" model as the Scientific Revolution rationalized and dissected nature to show all her secrets. As nature revealed her secrets, so too she was able to be controlled. Both this intention and the metaphor of "nature unveiled" are still prevalent in scientific language. Conceptions of the Earth as a nurturing bringer of life began slowly to change to one of a resource to be exploited as science became more confident that human minds could know all there was about the natural world and thereby effect changes on it at will.

The female earth was central to organic cosmology that was undermined by the Scientific Revolution and the rise of a market-oriented culture ... for sixteenth-century Europeans the root metaphor binding together the self, society and the cosmos was that of an organism ... organismic theory emphasized interdependence among the parts of the human body, subordination of individual to communal purposes in family, community, and state, and vital life permeate the cosmos to the lowliest stone.

Merchant cites Francis Bacon's use of female metaphors to describe the exploitation of nature at this time: "she is either free, ... or driven out of her ordinary course by the perverseness, insolence and forwardness of matter and violence of impediments ... or she is put in constraint, molded and made as it were new by art and the hand of man; as in things artificial ... nature takes orders from man and works under his authority". Nature must be "bound into service" and made a slave to the human ends of regaining our dominion over nature lost in the "fall from grace" in Eden.

In combination with increasing industrialization and the rise of capitalism that simultaneously replaced women's work such as weaving with machinery, and subsumed their roles as subsistence agriculturists, these changes also drove people to live in cities, further removing them from nature and the effects of industrialized production on it. The combined effects of industrialization, scientific exploration of nature, and the ascendancy of the dominion/domination metaphor over that of a nurturing Mother Earth, according to Merchant, can still be felt in social and political thought, as much as it was evident in the art, philosophy, and science of the seventeenth century.

== Legacy of The Death of Nature ==
Merchant's The Death of Nature leaves a scholarly legacy in the fields of environmental history, philosophy, and feminism. The book is considered groundbreaking due to her connection between the feminization of nature and the naturalization of women. Along with this connection, she backs up her claim with historical evidence during the time of enlightenment. However, Merchant was not the first to present ecofeminist ideals and theories. Françoise d'Eaubonne coined the term ecofeminisme to portray the influence of women and their ability to generate an ecological revolution in her 1974 book Le Feminisme ou la Mort. Susan Griffin's 1978 book Woman and Nature: The Roaring Inside Her, which also talks about women and ecology, was written just before the Death of Nature. The Death of Nature is influential despite these earlier works because it is the first interpretation of an ecofeminist perspective on the history of ecology.

== List of publications ==
- The Death of Nature: Women, Ecology and the Scientific Revolution (1980, 2e 1990, 3e 2020). Review by Paula Findlen.
- Ecological Revolutions: Nature, Gender, and Science in New England (1989, 2010)
- Radical Ecology: The Search for a Livable World (1992, 2005)
- Major Problems in American Environmental History (1993, 2004, 2012, editor)
- Key Concepts in Critical Theory: Ecology (1994, 2008, editor)
- Earthcare: Women and the Environment (1996)
- Green Versus Gold: Sources in California's Environmental History (1998, editor)
- Columbia Guide to American Environmental History (2002)
- Reinventing Eden: The Fate of Nature in Western Culture (2003, 2013)
- Encyclopedia of World Environmental History, 3 vols. (2004, co-editor)
- American Environmental History: An Introduction (2007)
- Autonomous Nature: Problems of Prediction and Control from Ancient Times to the Scientific Revolution (2015)
- Spare the Birds! George Bird Grinnell and the First Audubon Society (2016)
- Science and Nature: Past, Present and Future (2018)
- The Anthropocene and the Humanities (2020)

== See also ==
- List of ecofeminist authors
- Debora Hammond
- Georg Agricola
- John Muir
- Romanticism in science
