= Gloria Feman Orenstein =

American art historian

- Born: 1938 (age 87–88); Brooklyn, New York
- Died: 2026, 88; New York
- Known for: art and literary criticism
- Movement: Surrealism, Ecofeminism
- Awards: Veteran Feminists of America, 2003; Vesta Award from the Woman's Building, 1984; Lifetime Achievement Award, Women's Caucus of Art, College Art Association, 2018.

Gloria Feman Orenstein (born 1938 in Brooklyn, died October 17, 2026) is a feminist art critic, pioneer in the field of the women of Surrealism and scholar of ecofeminism in the arts. Orenstein's Reweaving the World is considered a seminal ecofeminist text which has had "a crucial role in the development of U.S. ecofeminism as a political position".

== Biography ==
Orenstein received a B.A. in Romance Languages and Literature from Brandeis University in 1959 and an M.A. in Slavic Languages and Literature from Radcliffe Graduate School of Harvard University in 1961. She studied in abroad in 1957 and 1958 completing courses at both the Sorbonne, University of Paris and Ecole du Louvre. Orenstein began her teaching career in 1963, when she accepted a position teaching High school French in Lexington, MA. She returned to New York University to continue her education, completing a Ph.D. in Comparative Literature in 1971. From 1975 to 1981 she was faculty of Rutgers University where she also served as the chair of the Women's Studies Program from 1976 to 1978. She was hired as Professor in the Department of Comparative Literature and Gender Studies at the University of Southern California in 1981 where she taught until she retired. She is a professor emerita of the University of Southern California.

Orenstein was the apprentice of Sámi shaman Ellen Marit Gaup Dunfjeld. Orenstein received a Lifetime Achievement award from the Women's Caucus for Art in February 2018 in Los Angeles, CA.

== Work ==
Orenstein's early work focuses on the women of Surrealism. Her first book The Theater of the Marvelous: Surrealism and The Contemporary Stage (1975) established her as a pioneer of the field.

== Important writings ==
=== Reweaving the World ===
Reweaving the World, co-edited by Orenstein and Irene Diamond, posits an ecofeminist movement that brings together “the environmental, feminist, and women’s spirituality movements out of a shared concern for the well-being of the Earth and all forms of life that our Earth supports.” In the book, Orenstein described “’ecofeminist arts’ function [as] ceremonially to connect us with the two powerful worlds from which the Enlightenment severed us—nature and the spirit world.” She suggested such arts often invoked the symbol of the Great Mother (Goddess) to emphasize three levels of creation “imaged as female outside patriarchy: cosmic creation, procreation, and artistic creation.” Orenstein explored the work of artists, poets and authors such as Helène Aylon, Ellen Marit Gaup Dunfjeld, Ursula Le Guin, Rachel Rosenthal, Fern Shaffer, Vijali Hamilton, and Mierle Laderman Ukeles, who used ritual, ceremony, performance and writing to enact transformation, reconnection and restoration of harmony.

=== The Reflowering of the Goddess ===
Orenstein calls for a reorganization of civilization based on the return to Goddess focused culture. She makes a radical ecofeminist argument which "considers the return of the Goddess as a sign of the return to an attitude of reverence for the Earth...and of an ecological as well as a non-sexist consciousness" detailing a plan of action which relies less on a Utopian model than on the creative works of visual and literary artists of the era. For her, storytelling is the key to transforming the cosmic mythos, and works created out of "the artistic culture inaugurated by the contemporary women's movement", reveal an already extant body of "feminist matristic" mythology providing a path to a new mythic paradigm that will save the planet.

=== The theater of the marvelous: Surrealism and the contemporary stage ===
Orenstein joins the formerly disparate theatre and surrealism in articulating her conception of The Theater of the Marvelous. She works to differentiate a neosurrealist theatre from the Dadaist Theater of the Absurd, out of which it grew, exploring a transnational collection of playwrights including: Elena Garro, Teofilo Cid, Octavio Paz, Robert Benayoun, Aimé Césaire and Leonora Carrington to combat the tendency to view affiliation with the Bretonist school as the main criteria in defining a work as surrealist. Instead the oneiric vision, the invocation of a dream world, the breaking down of reality to reveal interior imaginative truths, becomes the defining criteria. Orenstein seeks to convince the reader that these works have transcended the traditional goal of theater, to conjure a convincing likeness of the real; that they possess the power to effect inner change, transformative consciousness expansion, in the spectator.

== Critiques of writings ==
Orenstein's Reweaving the World has received criticism for gender essentialism.

== Selected bibliography ==
Orenstein has authored and edited several books. Her articles have been published in art and literary journals and translated into many languages.

=== Books ===
- Multi-Cultural Celebrations: The Paintings of Betty Laduke 1972-1992 (Pomegranate Books, 1993)
- Reweaving the World: The Emergence of Ecofeminism (Sierra Club Books, 1990)
- The Reflowering of the Goddess (Pergamon Press, 1990)
- The Theater of the Marvelous

=== Book chapters ===
- Orenstein, Gloria Feman (1993), "Toward an ecofeminist ethic of Shamanism and the sacred", in Adams, Carol J. (ed.), Ecofeminism and the sacred, New York: Continuum, pp. 44–49, ISBN 9780826406675.

=== Articles ===
- Torah Study, Feminism and Spiritual Quest in the Work of Five American Jewish Women Artists in Nashim: A Journal of Jewish Women's Studies & Gender Issues. No.14(Fall 2007). pp. 97–130
- The Greening of Gaia: Ecofeminist Artists Revisit the Garden in Ethics and the Environment. Vol. 8, No. 1,(Spring, 2003), pp. 102–111
- The "Problematics" of Writing about Sacred Ritual and the Spiritual Journey in Women's Studies Quarterly. Vol.21 (Spr/Sum 1993).
- The Salon of Natalie Clifford Barney: Interview with Berthe Cleyrergue in Signs. Vol. 4, No. 3 (Spring 1979).
- Reemergence of the Archetype of the Great Goddess in Art by Contemporary Women in Heresies. Vol.2, No.2 (Spring 1978), pp. 74–85
- Review Essay: Art History in Signs. Vol. 1, No.2 (Winter 1975).
- Art History and the Case for the Women of Surrealism in The Journal of General Education. Vol. 27, No. 1 (Spring 1975), pp. 31–54
- Women of Surrealism in The Feminist Art Journal. (Spring 1973), pp. 15–21
