= Alicia Puleo =

Argentine-born feminist philosopher

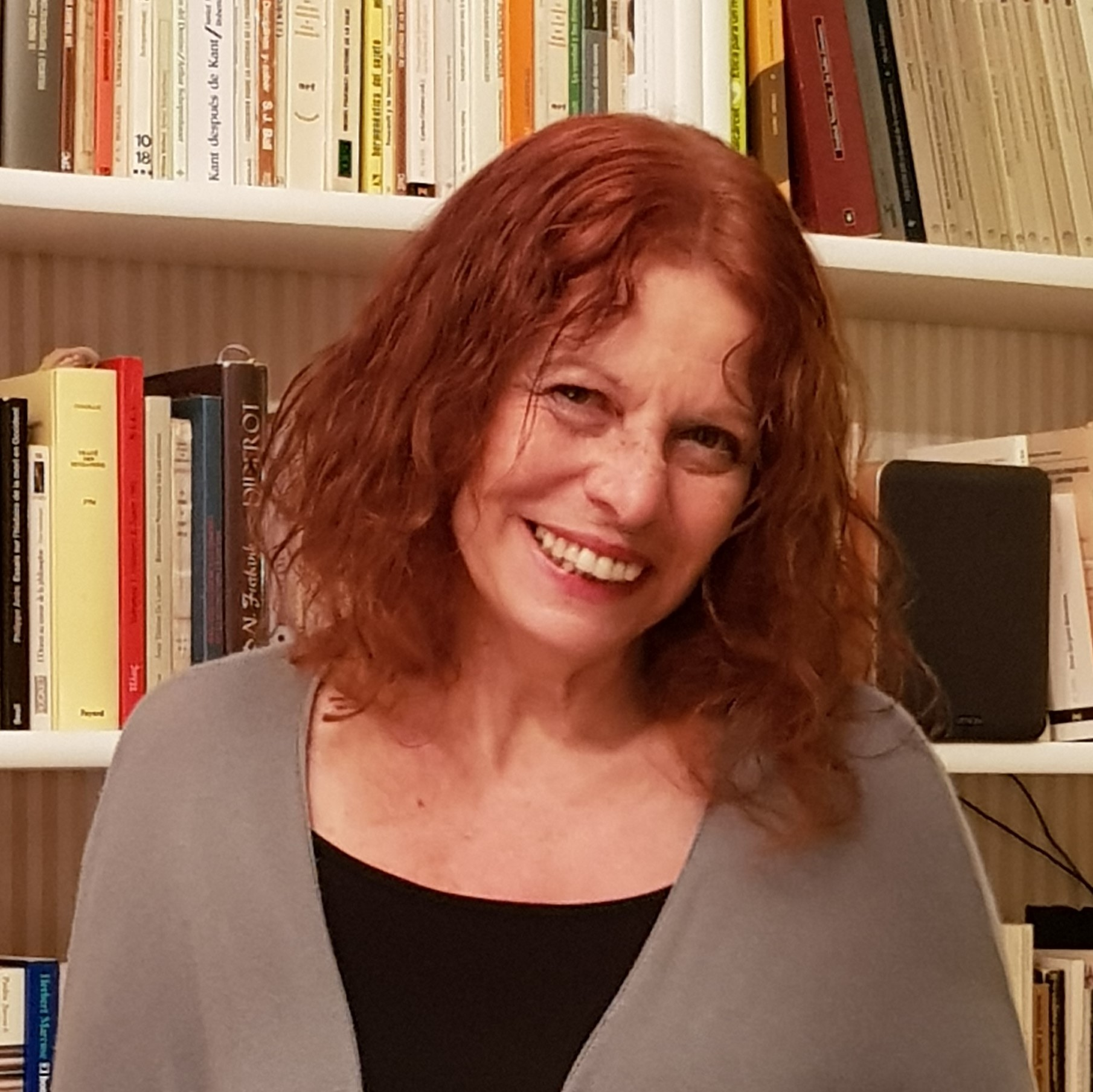
- Alicia Puleo in 2020
- Born: Alicia Helda Puleo García; 30 November 1952 (age 73); Buenos Aires, Argentina
- Education: Complutense University of Madrid
- Occupations: Philosopher, professor, writer
- Employer: University of Valladolid
- Website: aliciapuleo.net

Alicia Helda Puleo García (born 30 November 1952) is an Argentine-born feminist philosopher based in Spain. She is known for the development of ecofeminist thinking. Among her main publications is Ecofeminismo para otro mundo posible (Ecofeminism for Another Possible World; 2011).

== Biography ==
Alicia Puleo holds a PhD in Philosophy from the Complutense University of Madrid and is a Profesora Titular (associate professor) of Moral and Political Philosophy at the University of Valladolid.

She is a member of the latter university's Council of the Chair of Gender Studies, and of the Council of the Complutense University's Instituto de Investigaciones Feministas (Feminist Research Institute).

She directed the Chair of Gender Studies at the University of Valladolid for a decade (2000–2010) and has coordinated several seminars at the Instituto de Investigaciones Feministas including the Discurso sobre la sexualidad y crítica feminista (Discourse on Feminist Sexuality and Criticism) and Feminismo y ecología (Feminism and Ecology).

Puleo has combined her teaching career with research and the publication of numerous books and articles on inequality between men and women, gender, and feminism.

She was a finalist for the National Essay Award for the book Dialéctica de la sexualidad. Género y sexo en la filosofía contemporánea (Dialectic of Sexuality: Gender and Sex in Contemporary Philosophy; 1992).

In 2004, she coordinated editing of the book Mujeres y ecología: Historia, pensamiento, sociedad (Women and Ecology: History, Thought, Society) that discussed the relationship between the environmental movement and the feminist movement and different experiences in Spain and the international arena.

In 2011, Puleo published Ecofeminismo para otro mundo posible (Ecofeminism for Another Possible World), a work in which in addition to collecting the history of ecofeminism and analyzing the contributions of the feminist movement to the environmental movement, which are not always recognized, she developed her proposal of what she has called a critical or enlightened ecofeminism.

In September 2014, she assumed the direction of the publisher Editorial Cátedra's Feminism Collection.

In 2015, she published the collective book Ecología y género en diálogo interdiciplinar (Gender and Ecology in Interdisciplinary Dialogue), in which the socio-cultural frameworks that weave relationships between bodies and the ecosystems they inhabit are analyzed.

== Gender inequality ==
Puleo's work is articulated around the concern for inequality between men and women. She analyzes the socio-cultural mechanisms that prevent overcoming this inequality and the means that feminist philosophy offers to defuse them. In some of her studies on the French Enlightenment, she examines the roots of this pending subject of modern democracies. The works dedicated to the evolution of the concept of sexuality in Arthur Schopenhauer's contemporary philosophy to Georges Bataille are configured as a critique of the legitimizing theories of violence to which she has referred with the concept of "transgressive eroticism".

Her work has bridged the gap between different currents in feminist theory. In her essay "For a Better World: Alicia Puleo's Critical Ecofeminism", UCLA professor Roberta Johnson writes, "In moving beyond the polarizing division between equality and difference feminism that has characterized Spanish feminist theory in the 1980s and 1990s, Puleo has found ways to combine equality feminism's reason and difference feminism's affect."

== Ecofeminism ==
Puleo is recognized as one of the most relevant ecofeminist thinkers today. Roberta Johnson characterizes her as "arguably Spain's most prominent explicator-philosopher of the worldwide movement or theoretical orientation known as ecofeminism."

Puleo's proposal of what she has called a critical or enlightened ecofeminism can be considered a new nonessentialist form of environmental ethics in terms of gender. She does not consider that women are in a kind of symbiosis with nature, but is of the conviction that we live in an era of unsustainable growth that makes the link between feminism and ecology inevitable. She maintains that the mutual enrichment of both perspectives would allow building a culture of equality and sustainability.

My position is rooted in the enlightened tradition of analysis of oppressive doctrines and practices. It claims the equality and autonomy of women, with particular attention to the recognition of sexual and reproductive rights that in some forms of ecofeminism could be eroded in the name of the sanctity of life. It accepts the benefits of scientific and technological knowledge with prudence and vigilant attitude. It promotes the universalization of the values of the ethics of care, avoiding making women the saviors of the planet. It proposes intercultural learning without undermining the human rights of women and affirms the unity and continuity of Nature out of evolutionary knowledge, the feeling of compassion, and the will for justice towards non-human animals, that Other ignored and silent, but capable of yearning, loving, and suffering.

— Alicia Puleo, Ecofeminismo para otro mundo posible

== Publications ==
=== Individual ===
- Cómo leer a Schopenhauer (1991) Editorial Júcar, Gijón-Madrid, ISBN 8433408097
- Dialéctica de la sexualidad. Género y sexo en la Filosofía Contemporánea (1992) Cátedra, Madrid, ISBN 8437610516
- La Ilustración olvidada. La polémica de los sexos en el siglo XVIII (1993), A. H. Puleo, editor. Prologue by Celia Amorós, with texts by Condorcet, Olympe de Gouges, Montesquieu, D'Alembert, and Louise d'Épinay. Anthropos, Barcelona. ISBN 9788476584088
- Figuras del Otro en la Ilustración francesa. Diderot y otros autores (1996) Escuela Libre Editorial, Madrid, ISBN 8488816162
- Filosofía, Género y Pensamiento crítico (2000) University of Valladolid, ISBN 8484480267
- Ecofeminismo para otro mundo posible (2011) Editorial Cátedra. Feminism Collection. Madrid, ISBN 9788437627298

=== Collective ===
- La filosofía contemporánea desde una perspectiva no androcéntrica (1992) A. H. Puleo, coord., Ministry of Education and Science, Madrid, ISBN 8436923383
- Papeles sociales de mujeres y hombres (1995) Alicia H. Puleo and Elisa Favaro, coord., Ministry of Education and Science, Madrid, 1995, ISBN 8436927672
- "Philosophie und Geschlecht in Spanien", in Die Philosophin (December 2002) No. 26, pp. 103–112, ISSN 0936-7586
- Mujeres y Ecología. Historia, Pensamiento, Sociedad (2004) Cavana, María Luisa; Puleo, Alicia; Segura, Cristina, eds., Almudayna, Madrid, ISBN 8487090311
- '"Gender, Nature and Death" (2005) in De Sotelo, Elisabeth (ed.), New Women in Spain. Social-Political and Philosophical Studies of Feminist Thought, Lit Verlag, Münster/Transaction Publishers, New York, 2005, pp. 173–182, ISBN 3825861996
- "Del ecofeminismo clásico al deconstructivo: principales corrientes de un pensamiento poco conocido" (2005) in Amorós, Celia, De Miguel, Ana (eds.), Historia de la teoría feminista. De la Ilustración a la globalización, Minerva, Madrid, 2005, pp. 121–152, ISBN 848812354X
- "Un parcours philosophique: du désenchantement du monde à la compassion" in L'Esprit créateur (2006) Johns Hopkins University Press, Baltimore, Vol. 46, No. 2, pp. 5–16, ISSN 0014-0767
- "Philosophy, Politics and Sexuality", in Femenías, María Luisa; Oliver, Amy; Feminist Philosophy in Latin America and Spain (2007) VIPS RODOPI, Amsterdam/New York, ISBN 9789042022072
- "El hilo de Aradna: ecofeminismo, animales y crítica al androcentrismo" in Feminismo Ecológico. Estudios multidisciplinares de género (2007), University of Salamanca
- El reto de la igualdad de género. Nuevas perspectivas en Ética y Filosofía Política (2008) Alicia H. Puleo, Biblioteca Nueva, Madrid, ISBN 9788497428668
- "Libertad, igualdad, sostenibilidad, por un ecofeminismo ilustrado" (2008) in Isegoría. Revista de Filosofía Moral y Política No. 38, Spanish National Research Council, Madrid, January–June 2008, pp. 39–59, ISSN 1130-2097
- Ecología y Género en diálogo interdisciplinar (2015), Plaza y Valdés, ISBN 9788416032433
- "Lo personal es político: el surgimiento del feminismo radical" (2005) in Ana de Miguel Álvarez and Celia Amorós, Teoría feminista: de la ilustración a la globalización II, Minerva. p. 58, ISBN 848812354X
