= Ecofeminism =

Approach to feminism influenced by ecologist movement

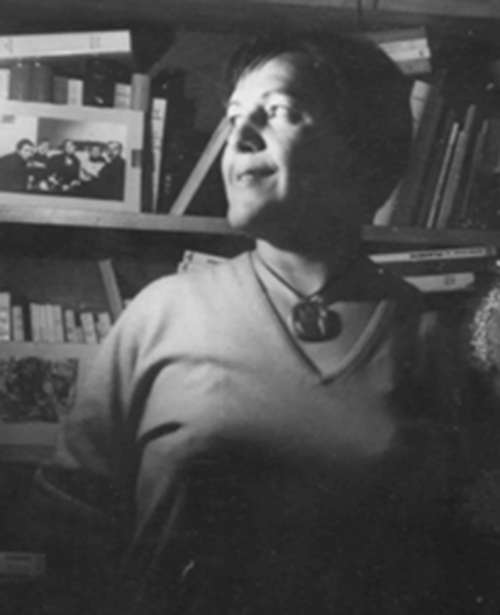
French writer Françoise d'Eaubonne coined the term in a 1974 book.

Ecofeminism integrates feminism and political ecology. Ecofeminist thinkers draw on the concept of gender to analyze relationships between humans and the natural world. The term was coined by the French writer Françoise d'Eaubonne in her 1974 book Le Féminisme ou la Mort. Ecofeminist theory introduces a feminist perspective to green politics and calls for an egalitarian, collaborative society in which there is no one dominant group.

Today, there are several branches of ecofeminism, with varying approaches and analyses, including liberal ecofeminism, spiritual/cultural ecofeminism, and social/socialist ecofeminism (or materialist ecofeminism). Interpretations of ecofeminism and how it might be applied to social thought include ecofeminist art, social justice and political philosophy, religion, economics, contemporary feminism, and literature.

Ecofeminist analysis addresses the political effects of culturally constructed parallels between the oppression of wildlife and the oppression of women. These parallels include, but are not limited to, seeing women and nature as property, seeing men as the curators of culture and women as the curators of nature, and how men dominate women and humans dominate nature. Ecofeminism emphasizes that both women and nature must be respected.

== Worldwide activism ==
Professors of sociology, Maria Mies, Ariel Salleh and Susan Mann all associate the beginning of ecofeminism not with feminists but with women of many historically different backgrounds who have perceived connections between gender, race, class, and environmental issues. The ideal of intersectionality is upheld through the notion that in activist and theory circles marginalized groups must be included in the discussion. However, in early North American environmentalism, the issues of race and class were sometimes separated.

Women have long worked to protect wildlife, food, air and water. These efforts coincided with new developments in environmental theory from writers such as Henry David Thoreau, Aldo Leopold, John Muir, and Rachel Carson. Parallel examples from women environmental ethicists were the books Silent Spring by Rachel Carson and Refuge by Terry Tempest Williams.

Ecofeminist Karen Warren lists Aldo Leopold's essay "Land Ethic" (1949) as fundamental to her own ecofeminist philosophy, as Leopold was the first to pen an ethic for the land which understands all non-human parts of that community (animals, plants, land, air, water) as equal to and in a relationship with humans. That inclusive understanding of the environment helped launch the modern preservation movement showing how environmental issues can be viewed through a framework of caring.

In India, in the state of Uttarakhand in 1973, women took part in the Chipko movement to protect forests from deforestation. Many men during this time were moving to cities in search of work, and women that stayed in the rural parts of India were reliant on the forests for subsistence. As documented by Vandana Shiva, Non-violent protest tactics were used to occupy trees so that loggers could not cut them down.

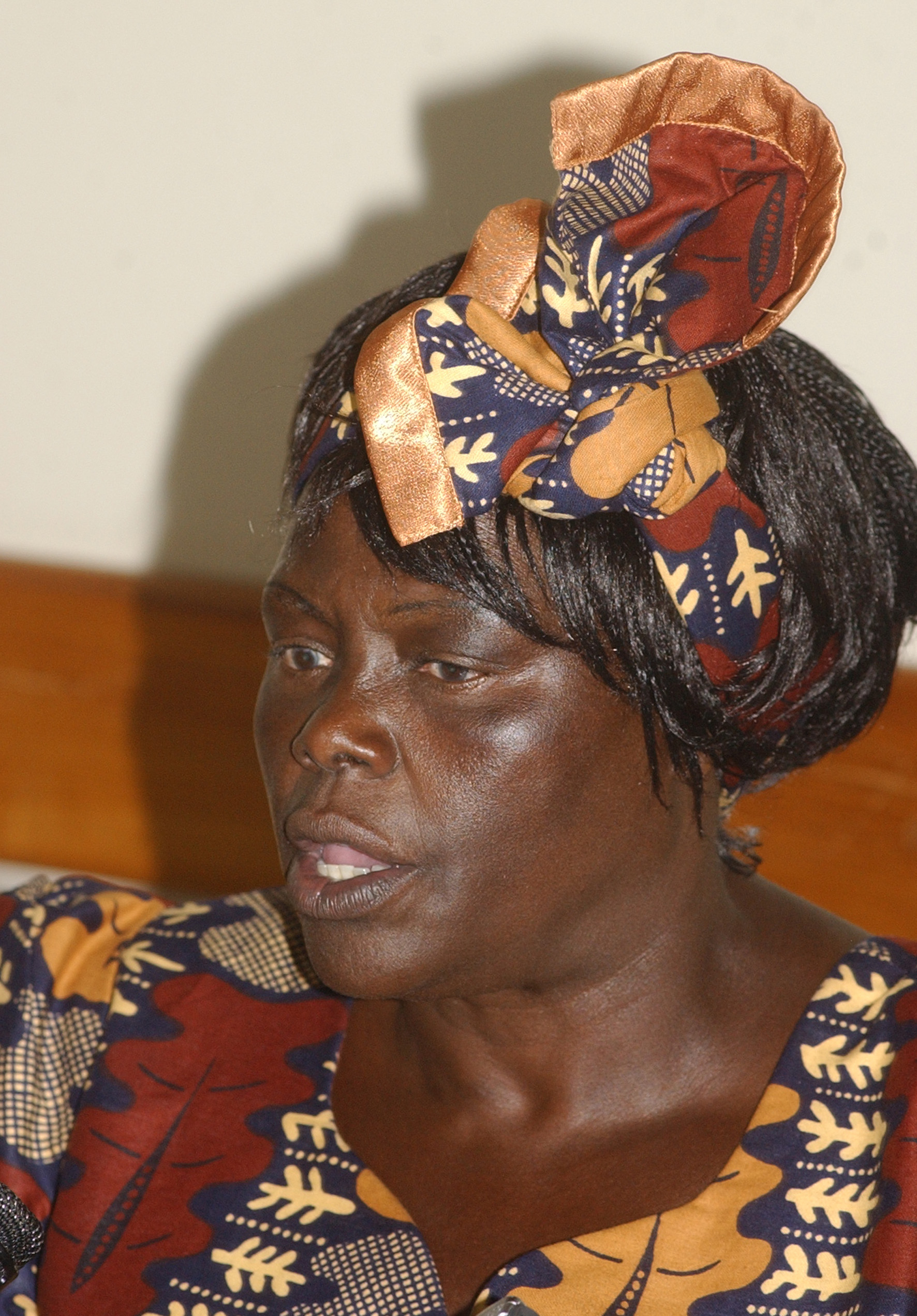
Kenyan environmental and political activist, Wangari Maathai

In Kenya in 1977, the Green Belt Movement was initiated by environmental and political activist Professor Wangari Maathai. It is a rural tree planting program led by women, which Maathai designed to help prevent desertification in the area. The program created a 'green belt' of at least 1,000 trees around villages, and gave participants the ability to take charge in their communities. In later years, the Green Belt Movement was an advocate for informing and empowering citizens through seminars for civic and environmental education, as well as holding national leaders accountable for their actions and instilling agency in citizens. The work of the Green Belt Movement continues today.

In 1978 in New York, mother and environmentalist Lois Gibbs led her community in protest after discovering that their entire neighborhood, Love Canal, was built on top of a toxic dump site. The toxins in the ground were causing illness among children and reproductive issues among women, as well as birth defects in babies born to pregnant women exposed to the toxins. The Love Canal movement eventually led to the evacuation and relocation of nearly 800 families by the federal government.

In 1980 and 1981, women like ecofeminist Ynestra King organized a peaceful protest at the Pentagon. Women stood, hand in hand, demanding equal rights (including social, economic, and reproductive rights) as well as an end to militaristic actions taken by the government and exploitation of the community (people and the environment). This movement is known as the Women's Pentagon Actions.

In 1985, the Akwesasne Mother's Milk Project was launched by Katsi Cook. This study was funded by the government, and investigated how the higher level of contaminants in water near the Mohawk reservation impacted babies. It revealed that through breast milk, Mohawk children were being exposed to 200% more toxins than children not on the reservation. Toxins contaminate water all over the world, but due to environmental racism, certain marginalized groups are exposed to a much higher amount.

The Greening of Harlem Coalition is another example of an ecofeminist movement. In 1989, Bernadette Cozart founded the coalition, which is responsible for many urban gardens around Harlem. Cozart's goal is to turn vacant lots into community gardens. This is economically beneficial, and also provides a way for very urban communities to be in touch with nature and each other. The majority of people interested in this project (as noted in 1990) were women. Through these gardens, they were able to participate in and become leaders of their communities. Urban greening exists in other places as well. Beginning in 1994, a group of African-American women in Detroit have developed city gardens, and call themselves the Gardening Angels. Similar garden movements have occurred globally.

At the culmination of the decade, ecofeminism had spread to both USA coasts and articulated an intersectional analysis of women and the environment. Eventually, challenging ideas of environmental classism and racism, resisting toxic dumping and other threats to the impoverished.

In terms of the international movement, Ariel Salleh's book Ecofeminism as Politics (last reprinted in 2017) contains a detailed account of women's ecofeminist actions from Japan and the Pacific to Scandinavia.

== Early texts ==
Though the scope of ecofeminist analysis is dynamic and diverse ecofeminist perspectives have emerged from women activists and thinkers all over the world, academic studies of ecofeminism have been dominated by North American universities. Thus, Charlene Spretnak described ecofeminist work developing: 1) through the study of political theory as well as history; 2) through belief and study of nature-based religions; and 3) through environmentalism. In a 1993 essay entitled "Ecofeminism: Toward Global Justice and Planetary Health", authors Greta Gaard and Lori Gruen defined what they call the "ecofeminist framework". The essay provides a wealth of data and statistics in addition to outlining the theoretical aspects of the ecofeminist critique. The framework was intended to establish ways of viewing and understanding the current global crisis so as to better understand how we arrived at this point and what may be done to ameliorate it.

Building on the work of Rosemary Ruether and Carolyn Merchant, Gaard and Gruen argued that there are four forces behind this political framework:

1. The rise of patriarchal religions and their establishment of gender hierarchies along with their denial of immanent divinity.
2. The mechanistic materialist model of the universe that resulted from the scientific revolution and the subsequent reduction of all things into mere resources to be optimized, dead inert matter to be used.
3. Traditional cultural dualisms based on masculinity v femininity, self v other, humanity v nature, and the inherent power and domination ethic these entail.
4. Capitalism and its intrinsic need for the instrumental exploitation of animals, earth and people for the sole purpose of creating wealth.

These four factors have brought Western cultures to what ecofeminists see as a "separation between nature and culture" that is the root source of our planetary ills.

Some ecofeminist approaches developed out of anarcha-feminist concerns to abolish all forms of domination, including the oppressive character of humanity's relationship to the natural world. According to d'Eaubonne's book Le Féminisme ou la Mort, ecofeminism relates the oppression of all marginalized groups (women, people of color, children, the poor) to the oppression and domination of nature (animals, land, water, air, etc.). She argued that domination, exploitation, and colonization under Western patriarchal society has directly caused irreversible environmental damage. An activist and organizer, d'Eaubonne worked for the eradication of all social injustice, not just injustice against women and the environment.

Influential early texts included: Women and Nature (Susan Griffin 1978), The Death of Nature (Carolyn Merchant 1980) and Gyn/Ecology (Mary Daly 1978), which helped propel the association between domination by men of women and the domination of culture over nature. Meanwhile feminist activism of the 1980s included grass-roots movements such as the National Toxics Campaign, Mothers of East Los Angeles (MELA), and Native Americans for a Clean Environment (NACE) led by women devoted to issues of human health and environmental justice. Writing from this circle discussed ecofeminism drawing from Green Party politics, peace movements, and direct action movements. A key figure at this time was Petra Kelly, a founder of the German Green Party.

== Gendering nature ==
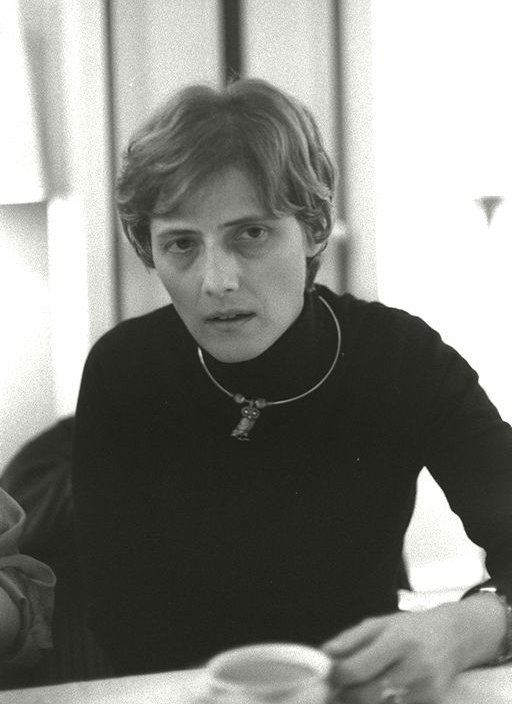
Petra Kelly, Co-founder of the Green Party in Germany

A recurring claim within ecofeminist literature is that masculinist structures justify their dominance through binary oppositions, these include but are not limited to: heaven/earth, mind/body, male/female, human/animal, spirit/matter, culture/nature, white/non-white, and abled/disabled. Oppression is reinforced by applying these binaries in social judgements of value/non-value. Ecofeminist theory asserts that capitalism is built on paternalist and masculinist values, such that the effects of capitalism cannot benefit women.

Ecofeminist scholars emphasized that it is not because women are female or "feminine" that they are sensitive to nature, but because they experience oppression by the same masculinist forces. This marginalization is evident in the standard gendered language used to describe nature, such as "Mother Earth" or "Mother Nature", and the animalized language used to describe women in derogatory terms. By contrast, other ecofeminists prefer to emphasise the value of women's skills learned from the traditional social role as 'caregiver'.

The Indian ecofeminist and activist Vandana Shiva wrote that women farmers have a special connection to the environment through daily experience and that this has been underestimated. According to Shiva's book Staying Alive (1989), women in subsistence economies who produce "wealth in partnership with nature, have been experts in ecological knowledge of nature's processes". She makes the point that "these alternative modes of knowing, which are oriented to the social benefits and sustenance needs are not recognized by the reductionist capitalist paradigm, because it fails to perceive the interconnectedness of nature, or the connection of women's lives, work and knowledge with the creation of wealth". Shiva attributes this failure to the global domination of Western perceptions of development and progress. According to Shiva, patriarchy has left women, nature, and many other groups outside of the economy, labelling them "unproductive". Similarly, Ariel Salleh deepens this materialist ecofeminist approach in a critical dialogue with green politics and ecosocialism.

== Conceptual approaches ==
=== Materialist ecofeminism ===
In the book Ecofeminism (1993), Vandana Shiva and Maria Mies interrogate modern science and its acceptance as a universal and value-free system. They view the dominant stream of science not as objective but rather as a projection of Western patriarchal instrumentalism. The determination of what is considered scientific knowledge and its usage has been largely restricted to men. Examples include the medicalization of childbirth and the industrialization of plant reproduction.

The key activist-scholars developing a materialist ecofeminism are Maria Mies and Veronika Bennholdt-Thomsen in Germany; Vandana Shiva in India; Ariel Salleh in Australia; Mary Mellor in the UK; and Ana Isla in Peru. Materialist ecofeminism is not widely known in North America aside from the journal collective at Capitalism Nature Socialism. A materialist analysis studies economic institutions such as labor, power, and property as a critical mechanism for control over women and nature. The contrast is between production, which is valued, versus reproduction of living relations, which is not. This ecofeminism is referred to variously as "social feminism", "socialist ecofeminism", or "Marxist ecofeminism". According to Carolyn Merchant, "Social ecofeminism advocates the liberation of women through overturning economic and social hierarchies that turn all aspects of life into a market society that today even invades the womb". Ecofeminism in this sense seeks to eliminate social hierarchies which favor the production of commodities for profit over biological and social reproduction traditionally seen as the sphere of women's work.

=== Vegetarian ecofeminism ===
Vegetarian ecofeminism is a critical approach calls to include the oppression of non-human animals within the ecofeminism analyses. Critical scholars argue that excluding the oppression of animals in ecofeminist analyses is inconsistent with the theoretical foundations of feminism as movement that aims to end all forms of oppression. The vegetarian ecofeminist perspectives be traced back to the sympathy for non-human animals and counterculture movements of the 1960s and 1970s. According to Carol Adams, "We cannot work for justice and challenge the oppression of nature without understanding that the most frequent way we interact with nature is by eating animals." "Manhood is constructed in our culture in part by access to meat-eating and control of other bodies, whether it's women or animals.'' Greta Gaard argues that, "the personal is political", and labels meat-eating as a form of patriarchal violence, as it reflects and reinforces a system of male domination over both non-human animals and women.

=== Spiritual and cultural ecofeminism ===
Spiritual ecofeminism is an approach popular among North American authors such as Starhawk, Riane Eisler, Carol Christ and Carol Adams. Starhawk calls for an earth-based spirituality, which recognizes that the Earth is alive, and that we are all interconnected. Spiritual ecofeminism is not linked to any specific religion, but is centered around values of caring, compassion, and non-violence. Often, ecofeminists refer to ancient traditions, such as the worship of Gaia, the Goddess of nature and spirituality (also known as Mother Earth). Wicca and Paganism are particularly influential in spiritual ecofeminism. Wicca, in particular Dianic Wicca, traditionally demonstrates a deep respect for nature, a feminine outlook, and an aim to establish strong community values.

In her book Radical Ecology, Carolyn Merchant refers to spiritual ecofeminism as "cultural ecofeminism". According to Merchant, cultural ecofeminism "celebrates the relationship between women and nature through the revival of ancient rituals centered on goddess worship, the moon, animals, and the female reproductive system." Cultural ecofeminist practice intuition and an ethic of care in human-nature interrelationships.

=== Ecofeminism in Latin America ===
Latin American ecofeminism emerged as a distinct strand within the broader ecofeminist movement. While early ecofeminist frameworks were primarily shaped in the Global North, the publication of Staying Alive by Vandana Shiva in the mid-1980s marked a turning point. This work introduced the foundations for a postcolonial ecofeminism that would inspire and inform debates and reformulations in the Global South, including Latin America.

Latin America also had an early ecofeminist trajectory, although with less dissemination and influence in the global feminist theory. However, some scholars would agree that there is still a long way to go in the construction of a Latin American ecofeminism, which considers the leading role in the social and political struggles of rural women in the Global South committed to the sustainability of their practices of food production, the livelihood of their families, solidarity community relations, an inclusive economy and the support of human and non-human life.

From a Feminist Political Ecology perspective, there are new emphases through the cross-cutting influence of posthumanist thought, as well as postcolonial and decolonial ideas. These new emphases allow for a renewed engagement with Latin American and Global South ecofeminisms, while also opening up space for the inclusion of conceptual frameworks, lived experiences, and research contributions from both Latin American academia and activism.

It is also worth highlighting the role of the rural space as a place for deep structural violence against women, which constantly erases the stories, knowledge and experiences of many people, who are not allowed to speak and transmit valid knowledge about themselves and about the relationships of care, existence and life support that they build with nature, contemplating environmental preservation and sustainability.

==== Cuerpo Territorio ====
The concept of "Cuerpo-Territorio" - Body-Territory is a pivotal idea within Latin American ecofeminism, emerging from the struggles of indigenous communities against intertwined forms of oppression: patriarchy, colonialism, and extractivism. It serves both as a theoretical framework and a practical method of resistance, linking women's bodies as territories to be defended and the Earth as an entity endowed with rights against exploitation. It is said to have emerged as a concept and method from a political group of Maya-Xinka indigenous women in Guatemala and is central to the political project of community feminists.

Historically, colonialism involved the conquest and exploitation of territories, which also entailed the domination of bodies, particularly female bodies. During the Spanish colonization of the Americas, women were subjected to exploitation, including commodification, mass rape, and mutilation. Thus, the conquest of land became intertwined with the exploitation of women's bodies, making their bodies territories to be defended.

The emergence of the cuerpo-territorio concept within indigenous communities is no coincidence. These territories are systematically targeted by extractivism and colonization. Women in these communities are affected in their bodies but also use their bodies to resist and fight. The concept is constructed and utilized in opposition to the hierarchical dichotomy between body and nature, interior and exterior, which supposedly legitimizes the exploitation of nature by bodies.

The concept of cuerpo territorio asserts the body as a continuum of the land, seeing “the body as territory, and the territory as a body”. It frames the body as “ones most intimate and immediate geography,” and affirms a worldview in which bodies are part of the wider network of all life.

As Lorena Cabnal of the Indigenous Women’s Association of Santa María Xalapán explains, "territorio cuerpo-tierra is a motto to be recuperated and defended and implemented as a political banner in the defense of the land. It is a framework of struggle against sexual violence and mining. It is a political category of indigenous community feminism, a way to suggest and feel the body as territory alive and historical. It alludes to a cosmological interpretation and a politic that acknowledges how bodies have a relation and being in the network of all life. Concurrently, it pushes us to rethink how bodies have been constructed by multiple oppressions, the historical structure of patriarchy, colonialism, racism, and neoliberal capitalism, which have led to exploitation via different agreements and policies".

===== Body Mapping =====
Body mapping is a methodological approach grounded in the theory of cuerpo-territorio. Its methods center the body as a source of information. It is held as a decolonial methodology as it seeks to counter traditional Euro-centric research methods that heavily rely on written language via interviews, focus groups, and survey responses. In contrast to these Western methods, body mapping provides a safe, trauma informed way to feel and communicate the emotions and sensations related to bodily experiences. It has been framed by decolonial feminist scholars as a tool for self-empowerment and collective meaning making.

Body mapping creates a physical representation through drawing of the body and the violences it has suffered. This mapping overlays territorial conflicts onto the body to understand them from a corporeal and subjective perspective. Researcher Delmy Tania Cruz Hernández provides a concrete example in her book, recounting the story of a survivor of the Acteal massacre who, after the tragedy, drew a red cross over the heart in her mapping, leaving the rest of the body blank due to trauma. Thus, mapping becomes a form of resistance, concretizing the repercussions of territorial exploitation on bodies.

Body mapping methods often include some variation of the following steps:

1. Collectively creating a shared space of safety and support. This step often is used to build trust between participants and between participants and the researchers. For some projects, this includes crafting an ethics protocol together that outlines how they want to engage with each other, the space, and the final research output.
2. Perform a sensory group exercise to ground into the body and recognize them as full of life, feelings, memories and emotions.
3. An explanation of cuerpo territorio.
4. Participants help each other trace an outline of their silhouette on a body-sized piece of paper.
5. Participants then reflect on a series of questions asked by the researchers related to the topic, while participants answer them via writing, drawing, and creating in whatever form they like on the drawing of their body as a response. Each person then has their own unique body territory map.
6. Participants then may be asked to describe the meaning of their finished map.
7. Many projects emphasize that while maps are individual reflections of experience, a key aspect of the methodology is the sharing of their stories in community. Correlations, compassion, and larger shared themes are revealed, creating a process of collective meaning making.

==== Agua Territorio ====
The concept of "Agua Territorio" - Water-Body-Territory is used to describe the material and symbolic link between natural resources, women's bodies and land, deriving from the rural communities in Latin America, especially in the Andes, both in Chile and in Argentina, where water has been the blood of their territories.

It is a concept that is used in decolonial ecofeminism, political ecology and critical geographies. Latin American decolonial thinking in critical geography and political ecology serves to think of the embodiment of collective death and further debates on collective bodily autonomy.

Lobos Castro argues that the historical and structural dispossession of water in Chile - accelerated by Chile’s Water Code of 1981 with water as a common good began to fade - has produced an ecological and personal harm. This includes contamination, reduced access to water for subsistence agriculture, and exposure to toxic agrochemicals. Despite these challenges women in Chile developed "re-existences": practices of resistance and resilience that include reclaiming ancestral knowledge, cultivating communal solidarity, and defending local ecosystems. These actions reassert their connection to the land and their agency over environmental and social conditions.

The concept of agua terrritorio emphasizes the gendered nature of environmental conflicts and the importance of integrating women's voices and experiences in struggles for ecological justice and territorial autonomy.

== Common misconceptions ==
Vandana Shiva, Indian philosopher, scientist and environmentalist

=== Essentialism debate ===
In the 1980s and 1990s, critics challenged the political radicalism of ecofeminism by claiming it was 'essentialist'. Ecofeminists were seen to be reinforcing patriarchal norms of domination by emphasising links between women and nature. Poststructuralist and some Third wave feminists in particular, saw essentialism as grouping all women under one inferior category, so enforcing the very societal norms that feminism tries to break from. For the problem is that traditionally, just as 'feminine' qualities are seen as less worthy, nature and the animal world is also judged of 'lesser value' than what masculinist patriarchal cultures define as 'humanity proper'.

Meanwhile, ecofeminists were opposing liberal or 'equality' feminisms on the basis that mainstream political institutions are unconsciously masculinist - both sex/gender exclusionary and destructive of the environment. In an interview, ecofeminist Noel Sturgeon pointed out that what the anti-essentialists failed to recognise is a political strategy used to mobilize large and diverse groups of women, theorists and activists alike. Additionally, Charlene Spretnak characterized ecofeminism as concerned with a wide agenda, including reproductive technology, equal pay and equal rights, toxic pollution, Third World development, and more.

Norie Ross Singer emphasized that ecofeminism should be understood as advancing multiple axes of identity such as gender, race, and class as inter-meshed in human-nonhuman relationships. A. E. Kings identified this analysis as fundamentally 'intersectional'. Vegetarian ecofeminists have contributed to intersectional analysis as well, by joining a political focus on animal rights with activism for all oppressed life forms, including laboring men.

While the theologian Rosemary Radford Ruether rejected mysticism, she argued that spirituality and activism can combine effectively in ecofeminism. On the other hand, social ecologist Janet Biehl criticized ecofeminism for what she saw as a mystical reading of women and nature with not enough attention to the actual conditions of women’s lives. Biehl judged ecofeminism an anti-progressive movement for women. In the 21st century, some ecofeminists aware of these criticisms began renaming their work under other labels - like 'queer ecologies', 'global feminist environmental justice', or 'gender and the environment'.

Today the majority of ecofeminist thinkers and activists recognize both culturally constructed and embodied sex/gender differences. Moreover, socialist ecofeminists have always situated gender roles in a political economic framework, arguing for a radical materialist politics. Socialist feminists show clearly that women’s supposed intrinsic connection with nature is a socially constructed ideology. As Ariel Salleh has pointed out, the anxiety over essentialism was mostly found among North American liberal and postmodern feminist academics. In Europe and the global South, the interplay of class, race, gender and species dominations and exploitations is grounded in a materialist analysis of socio-economic relations.

=== Miscellaneous criticisms ===
Environmental justice and feminist care ethics have pushed for participation of all marginalized groups, working against racism, ageism, ableism. Andrew Charles points out that people with disabilities still face issues of access and representation in policy making. He suggests that the nurturing aspect of ecofeminism might be patronizing to marginalized groups. Likewise, a radical white savior complex could disrupt the self-advocacy of racially marginalized peoples around the world.

Catia Faria argues against the ecofeminist view that the main harm to non-human animals in the wild comes from patriarchal culture. It follows, she argues, that it is mistaken to argue that the conservation of nature is the best solution here. Instead, she contends, natural processes themselves are a source of immense suffering for wild animals and that we should work towards alleviating the harms they experience, as well as eliminating patriarchal sources of harm, such as hunting.

== Theorists ==
- Carol J. Adams – Adams is an American vegetarian-ecofeminist scholar and activist.
- Judi Bari – Bari was a principal organizer of the Earth First! movement and experienced sexist hostility.
- Françoise d'Eaubonne – Called upon women to lead an ecological revolution in order to save the planet. This entailed revolutionizing gender relations and human relations with the natural world.
- Greta Gaard – Gaard is an American ecofeminist scholar and activist. Her major contributions to the field connect ideas of queer theory, vegetarian ecofeminism, and animal liberation. Her major theories call to expand ecofeminism and other feminist theories to address a wider range of social issues. She is an ecological activist and leader in the U.S. Green Party, and the Green Movement.
- Susan Griffin - A radical feminist philosopher, essayist and playwright particularly known for her innovative, hybrid-form ecofeminist works. A Californian, she taught as an adjunct professor at UC Berkeley as well as at Stanford University and California Institute of Integral Studies.
- Ana Isla – Sociologist from Peru, member of Capitalism Nature Socialism ecofeminist editorial collective.
- Vanessa Lemgruber – Lemgruber is a Brazilian lawyer, writer, activist, and ecofeminist. She defends the Doce river in Brazil and advocates for water quality and zero waste movements.
- Sallie McFague – A prominent ecofeminist theologian, McFague uses the metaphor of God's body to represent the universe at large. This metaphor values inclusive, mutualistic and interdependent relations amongst all things.
- Carolyn Merchant – Historian of science who taught at University of California, Berkeley for many years. Her book The Death of Nature: Women, Ecology and the Scientific Revolution is a classic ecofeminist text.
- Mary Mellor – UK sociologist who moved to ecofeminist ideas from an interest in cooperatives. Her books Breaking the Boundaries and her later book Feminism and Ecology are grounded in a materialist analysis.
- Maria Mies – Mies is a German social critic who has been involved in feminist work throughout Europe and India. She works particularly on the intersections of patriarchy, poverty, and the environment on a local and global scale.
- Adrian Parr – A cultural and environmental theorist. She has published eight books and numerous articles on environmental activism, feminist new materialism, and imagination. Most notable is her trilogy Hijacking Sustainability. See also: The Wrath of Capital, and Birth of a New Earth.
- Val Plumwood – Val Plumwood, formerly Val Routley, was an Australian ecofeminist intellectual and activist, who was prominent in the development of radical ecosophy from the early 1970s through the remainder of the 20th century. In her work Feminism and the Mastery of Nature she describes the relationship of mankind and the environment relating to an eco-feminist ideology.
- Alicia Puleo – The author of several books and articles on ecofeminism and gender inequality, Alicia Puleo has been characterized as "arguably Spain's most prominent explicator-philosopher of the worldwide movement or theoretical orientation known as ecofeminism."
- Rosemary Radford Ruether – Has written 36 books and over 600 articles exploring the intersections of feminism, theology, and creation care. Ruether was the first person to connect the domination of the earth with the oppression of women.
- Ariel Salleh – Australian ecofeminist with a global perspective; a founding editor of the journal Capitalism Nature Socialism; author of four books and some 300 articles examining ecofeminist links with deep and social ecology, green politics and eco-socialism, digitalisation and decoloniality.
- Vandana Shiva – Shiva is a scientist by training, prolific author and Indian ecofeminist activist. She was a participant in the Chipko movement of the 1970s, which used non-violent activism to protest and prevent deforestation in the Garhwal Himalayas of Uttarakhand, India, then in Uttar Pradesh. Her fight against genetically modified organisms (GMOs) (together with the fights led by Rachel Carson against DDT and Erin Brockovich against hexavalent chromium) has been described as an example of ecofeminist position.
- Charlene Spretnak – Spretnak is an American writer largely known for her writing on ecology, politics and spirituality. Through these writings Spretnak has become a prominent ecofeminist. She has written many books which discuss ecological issues in terms of effects with social criticisms, including feminism. Spretnak's works had a major influence in the development of the Green Party. She has also won awards based on her visions on ecology and social issues as well as feminist thinking.
- Starhawk – An American writer and activist, Starhawk is known for her work in spiritualism and ecofeminism. She advocates for social justice in issues surrounding nature and spirit. These social justice issues fall under the scope of feminism and ecofeminism. She believes in fighting oppression through intersectionality and the importance of spirituality, eco consciousness and sexual and gender liberation.
- Douglas Vakoch – An American ecocritic whose edited volumes include Ecofeminism and Rhetoric: Critical Perspectives on Sex, Technology, and Discourse (2011), Feminist Ecocriticism: Environment, Women, and Literature (2012), Dystopias and Utopias on Earth and Beyond: Feminist Ecocriticism of Science Fiction (2021), Ecofeminist Science Fiction: International Perspectives on Gender, Ecology, and Literature (2021), The Routledge Handbook of Ecofeminism and Literature (2023), (with Nicole Anae) Indian Feminist Ecocriticism (2022), and (with Sam Mickey) Ecofeminism in Dialogue (2018), Literature and Ecofeminism: Intersectional and International Voices (2018), and Women and Nature?: Beyond Dualism in Gender, Body, and Environment (2018).
- Karen J. Warren – Warren received her B.A. in philosophy from the University of Minnesota (1970) and her Ph.D. from the University of Massachusetts-Amherst in 1978. Before her long tenure at Macalester College, which began in 1985, Warren was Professor of Philosophy at St. Olaf College in the early 1980s. Warren was the Ecofeminist-Scholar-in-Residence at Murdoch University in Australia. In 2003, she served as an Oxford University Round Table Scholar and as Women's Chair in Humanistic Studies at Marquette University in 2004. She has spoken widely on environmental issues, feminism, critical thinking and peace studies in many international locations including Buenos Aires, Gothenburg, Helsinki, Oslo, Manitoba, Melbourne, Moscow, Perth, the U.N. Earth Summit in Rio de Janeiro (1992), and San Jose.

== See also ==
- Climate change and gender
- Cottagecore
- Critical animal studies
- Cultural feminism
- Deep ecology
- Deep Green Resistance
- Ecofeminist art
- Green syndicalism
- List of ecofeminist authors
- Queer ecology
- Romanticism
- Sexecology
- Social ecology
- Women and the environment through history
- Posthumanism
