= Ariel Salleh =

Australian sociologist

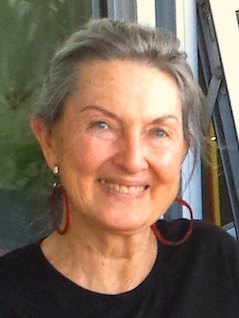
- Salleh in 2019
- Occupation: Sociologist

Ariel Salleh is an Australian sociologist who writes on humanity-nature relations, political ecology, social change movements, and ecofeminism.

== Background ==
Salleh is a founding member of the Global University for Sustainability, Hong Kong; visiting professor in the Faculty of Humanities, Nelson Mandela University, South Africa; formerly honorary associate professor in political economy, School of Social and Political Sciences, University of Sydney, Australia; and senior fellow in post-growth societies, Friedrich Schiller University Jena, Germany. She taught in social ecology at the University of Western Sydney for a number of years, and has lectured widely, including at New York University; ICS Manila; York University, Toronto; Lund University; the University of Ljubljana, and Peking University.

Salleh's theoretical position is developed in Ecofeminism as Politics: Nature, Marx, and the postmodern (2017/1997), Eco-Sufficiency & Global Justice: Women write Political Ecology (2009), and some 300 chapters and articles in the Journal of World-Systems Research (US), Globalizations (UK), Environmental Ethics (US), Arena (AU), New Left Review (UK), Organization & Environment (US), Environmental Politics (UK), and The Commoner (UK); with many anthology reprints and translations.

Her interdisciplinary analysis is seminal to political ecology as an emerging study of humanity-nature relations. The approach, an embodied materialism, emphasises the political economy of reproductive or regenerative labour in the world system. By relocating value in local everyday caregiving skills and indigenous knowledges, Salleh reconsiders social justice and sustainability questions like climate change and the neoliberal green economy and her current writing focuses on integrating the discourses of political ecology.

Salleh exemplifies the Marxist argument that hands-on praxis is essential to grounded political theory. Her work draws on practical experience in anti-nuclear politics, water catchments, biodiversity protection, and support for Asia-Pacific women's eco-sufficient community alternatives. She has been a governor of the International Sociological Association's Research Committee for Environment and Society and member of the Australian Federal Government's Gene Technology Ethics Committee. She serves on several editorial boards and is a founding editor of the US journal Capitalism Nature Socialism.

Salleh works at en/gendering dialogue between advocates of ecofeminist and eco-socialist politics. Her writing has addressed this terrain since the early 1980s and she was a signatory to the original Eco-Socialist Manifesto.

== Key concepts ==
=== Embodied materialism ===
In contrast to idealist ecofeminisms coming from philosophy and cultural studies, Salleh's materialist analysis is closer to that of fellow sociologists Maria Mies in Germany and Mary Mellor in the United Kingdom. Reproductive labor and economic use value are central themes here. Salleh's book Ecofeminism as Politics outlines the scope of an embodied materialist feminism, offering a transdisciplinary analysis of the deeply sex-gendered roots of capitalist patriarchal culture. It offers one of the earliest eco-socialist statements, though often not recognised as such because of its feminist framework.

=== Originary contradiction ===
In theorising the contemporary ecological crisis, Salleh argues that all 'humans-are-nature-in-embodied form'. However, from pre-capitalist patriarchal times and onwards through the European scientific revolution into modernity, the roles of men and women have been constructed differently with respect to the metabolism of human societies within nature. In this imaginary, men have been said to represent Humanity and civilisation, as women and later indigenous peoples are 'othered' as 'closer to nature'. Salleh traces the multiple everyday impacts of this 'originary contradiction'. They include the instrumental resourcing of labour - extractions from women's bodies in the first instance, colonised ethnicities next - 'as nature', while the Eurocentric 'Humanity over nature' ideology is used to justify that systemic hierarchy of exploitation.

=== Debt hierarchy ===
Globalised societies are riven by identity politics as each stratum in the capitalist patriarchal imaginary argues its singular interest through movement activism. Salleh's materialist analysis spells out how they are politically interlinked. Their structural exploitation on the hierarchy of appropriation is at once unique and part of a multi-faceted system of energy extraction and hence, debt. Salleh's book Eco-Sufficiency & Global Justice introduces this analysis and in later writing it develops as a system of six debts, providing a common denominator for workers, decolonial, women, youth, species, and planetary well-being. Each debt represents a thermodynamic drawdown, a violently unequal ecological exchange at the root of modern societies.

=== Meta-industrial class ===
The integration of decolonial, women's, and worker struggles for ecology with justice pivots on Salleh's analysis of 'meta-industrial labour'. Following Marx's inspiration, she reasons dialectically to extend his understanding of industrial labour to the hands-on lay knowledges of women, domestic providers, small farmers, and hunter-gatherers. Joining ecology back together with economics, she highlights the way in which meta-industrial labour meets social and embodied needs while simultaneously sustaining natural processes. This way of provisioning directly counters the entropic degradation or metabolic rift caused by capitalist extractivism and industrialisation.

=== Metabolic value ===
The meta-industrial labour - sex-gendered, racialised - captured by global capitalism, subsidises it by re-generating life processes in nature and in human bodies 'as nature'. Salleh identifies this unacknowledged 'debt' as a 'metabolic value', strictly speaking ecological rather than economic, and analytically distinct from use value and exchange value. Pointing to patriarchal bias in both orthodox Marxism and environmental politics, Salleh argues that the Left's narrow productivist focus on use and exchange value, and failure to acknowledge the metabolic value of natural living processes is an obstacle to formulation of a coherent eco-socialism, and to the unity of grassroots movements.

=== Movement of movements ===
While mainstream neoliberal policy continues to marginalise and commodify meta-industrial labour, Salleh urges political activists to embrace the embodied knowledge skills of meta-industrials and learn from their grounded empirical epistemology and vernacular science. She maintains that the worldwide unity of meta-industrial labour - the forces of re-production - through political actions like the World Social Forums and Global Tapestry of Alternatives, is essential to build a pluriversal and life-affirming Earth Democracy.

== Bibliography ==
- (1990) The Politics of Representation, Arena, 91: 163–169.
- (1997) Ecofeminism as Politics: Nature, Marx and the Postmodern. London: Zed Books and New York: St Martins Press.
- (1999) Dialogue with Meira Hanson: On Production and Reproduction, Identity and Non-identity, Organization & Environment, 12: 207–218.
- (2001) Sustaining Nature or Sustaining Marx? Reply to John Foster and Paul Burkett, Organization & Environment, 1: 43-450.
- (2001) Interview with Maria Mies: Women, Nature, and the International Division of Labour, in Veronika Bennoldt-Thomsen et al. (eds.), There Is An Alternative. London: Zed Books.
- (2001) Ecofeminism in Victor Taylor and Charles Winquist (eds.), The Postmodern Encyclopaedia. London: Routledge.
- (2004) Global Alternatives and the Meta-Industrial Class in Robert Albritton et al. (eds.), New Socialisms: Futures Beyond Globalization. New York: Routledge.
- (2005) Deeper than Deep Ecology in Baird Callicott and Clare Palmer (eds.), Environmental Philosophy, Vols. 1–5. London: Routledge.
- (2006) Social Ecology and the Man Question in Piers Stephens, John Barry, and Andrew Dobson (eds.), Contemporary Environmental Politics. London: Routledge.
- (2009) 'The Dystopia of Technoscience: An Ecofeminist Critique of Postmodern Reason', Futures, 41/4, 201–209.
- (2009) Eco-Sufficiency & Global Justice: women write political ecology. London: Pluto Press and New York: Palgrave Macmillan.
- (2010) 'From Metabolic Rift to Metabolic Value: Reflections on Environmental Sociology and the Alternative Globalization Movement', Organization & Environment, 23/2, 205–219.
- (2012) with Mary Mellor, Katharine Farrell, and Vandana Shiva, 'How Ecofeminists Use Complexity in Ecological Economics' in Katharine Farrell, Tommaso Luzzati, and Sybille van den Hove (eds.), Beyond Reductionism. London: Routledge, 154–178. (2011) 'Climate Strategy: Making the Choice between Ecological Modernisation or "Living Well"', Journal of Australian Political Ec
- (2017) 'Ecofeminism' in Clive Spash (ed.), Ecological Economics: Nature and Society. London: Routledge.
- (2019) 'Ecofeminism as (Marxist) Sociology' in Khayaat Fakier, Diana Mulinari, and Nora Rathzel (eds.) Marxist Feminist Theories and Struggles Today: Essential Writings on Intersectionality, Labour, and Ecofeminism. London: Zed Books.
- (2019) Ashish Kothari, Ariel Salleh, Arturo Escobar, Federico Demaria and Alberto Acosta (eds.) Pluriverse: A Post-Development Dictionary. New York: Columbia University Press and New Delhi: Tulika/ AuthorsUpFront.
- (2020) 'A Materialist Ecofeminist Reading of the Green Economy' in Hamed Hosseini, James Goodman, Sara Motta, and Barry Gills (eds.), The Routledge Handbook of Transformative Global Studies. London: Routledge.
- (2020) '"Holding" a Just and Ecological Peace' in Joe Camilleri and Deborah Guess (eds.) Towards a Just and Ecologically Sustainable Peace. Singapore: Palgrave.
- (2020) 'An Embodied Materialist Sociology' in Michael Bell, Michael Carolan, Julie Keller, and Katharine Legun (eds.), The Cambridge Handbook of Environmental Sociology. Cambridge: Cambridge University Press.

== Sources ==
- David Pellow (2018), 'Review of EcoFeminism as Politics: Nature, Marx and the Postmodern', Journal of World-Systems Research, doi:10.5195/JWSR.2018.864.
- Katrina Hamilton (2018), 'Review of EcoFeminism as Politics: Nature, Marx and the Postmodern', Socialism & Democracy, https://sdonline.org/issue/77/ecofeminism-politics-nature-marx-and-postmodern.
- Reviews by John Barry (1998) Environmental Politics; by Paul Burkett (2001) New Political Science
- Women and Life on Earth Project.
- International Political Economy and Ecology Summer School, York University, Canada, (2005).
- Newsletter of the International Society for Ecological Ethics (2007).
