= Charlene Spretnak =

American author (born 1946)

- Born: January 30, 1946 (age 79); Pittsburgh, Pennsylvania, U.S
- Occupation: Author

Charlene Spretnak (born January 30, 1946) is an American author who has written nine books on cultural history, social criticism (including feminism and Green politics), art, and religion and spirituality.

== Biography ==
Spretnak was born in Pittsburgh and grew up in Columbus, Ohio. She earned degrees from Saint Louis University in St. Louis, Missouri and the University of California, Berkeley. She is a professor emerita in philosophy and religion.

Throughout her life as a writer, speaker, and activist, she has been intrigued with dynamic interrelatedness, which plays a central role in each subject to which she has been drawn. She is particularly interested in 21st-century discoveries indicating that the physical world, including the human bodymind, is far more dynamically interrelated with nature and other people than modernity had assumed. Several of her books also proposed a "map of the terrain" of emergent social-change movements and an exploration of the issues involved. She has helped to create an eco-social frame of reference and vision in the areas of social criticism (including feminism and ecofeminism), cultural history, critique of technology, and women's spirituality.

Since the mid-1980s, her books have examined the multiple crises of modernity and furthered the corrective efforts that are arising. Her book Green Politics (1984) was a major catalyst for the formation of the U.S. Green Party movement, which she cofounded in the months following its publication. Her essay A View from the Chute (2018) proposes a possible new approach in talking to climate-change deniers about climate-change action.

== Awards and recognition ==
Her book The Resurgence of the Real was named by the Los Angeles Times as one of the Best Books of 1997. In 2006 Charlene Spretnak was named by the British government's Environment Department as one of the "100 Eco-Heroes of All Time." In 2012 she received the Demeter Award for lifetime achievement as "one of the premier visionary feminist thinkers of our time" from the Association for the Study of Women and Mythology.

== Selected works ==
- Lost Goddesses of Early Greece: A Collection of Pre-Hellenic Myths. Boston: Beacon Press (1978, 1981). ISBN 0-8070-1343-9
- The Politics of Women's Spirituality: Essays by Founding Mothers of the Movement, Editor. New York: Anchor/Doubleday (1981). ISBN 0-385-17241-9
- Green Politics: The Global Promise, with Fritjof Capra. New York: E. P. Dutton (1984). ISBN 0-525-24231-7
- The Spiritual Dimension of Green Politics. Santa Fe: Bear & Co (1986). ISBN 0-939680-29-7
- States of Grace: The Recovery of Meaning in the Postmodern Age. San Francisco: HarperSanFrancisco (1991). ISBN 0-06-250697-8
- The Resurgence of the Real: Body, Nature, and Place in a Hypermodern World. New York: Routledge (1997). ISBN 0-415-92298-4
- Missing Mary: The Queen of Heaven and Her Re-Emergence in the Modern Church. New York: Palgrave Macmillan (2004). ISBN 1-4039-7040-8
- Relational Reality: New Discoveries of Interrelatedness That Are Transforming the Modern World. Topsham, ME: Green Horizon Books (2011). ISBN 0-615-46127-1
- The Spiritual Dynamic in Modern Art: Art History Reconsidered, 1800 to the Present (2014) Palgrave Macmillan ISBN 9781137350039
