= Women's work =

Work believed to be exclusively the domain of women

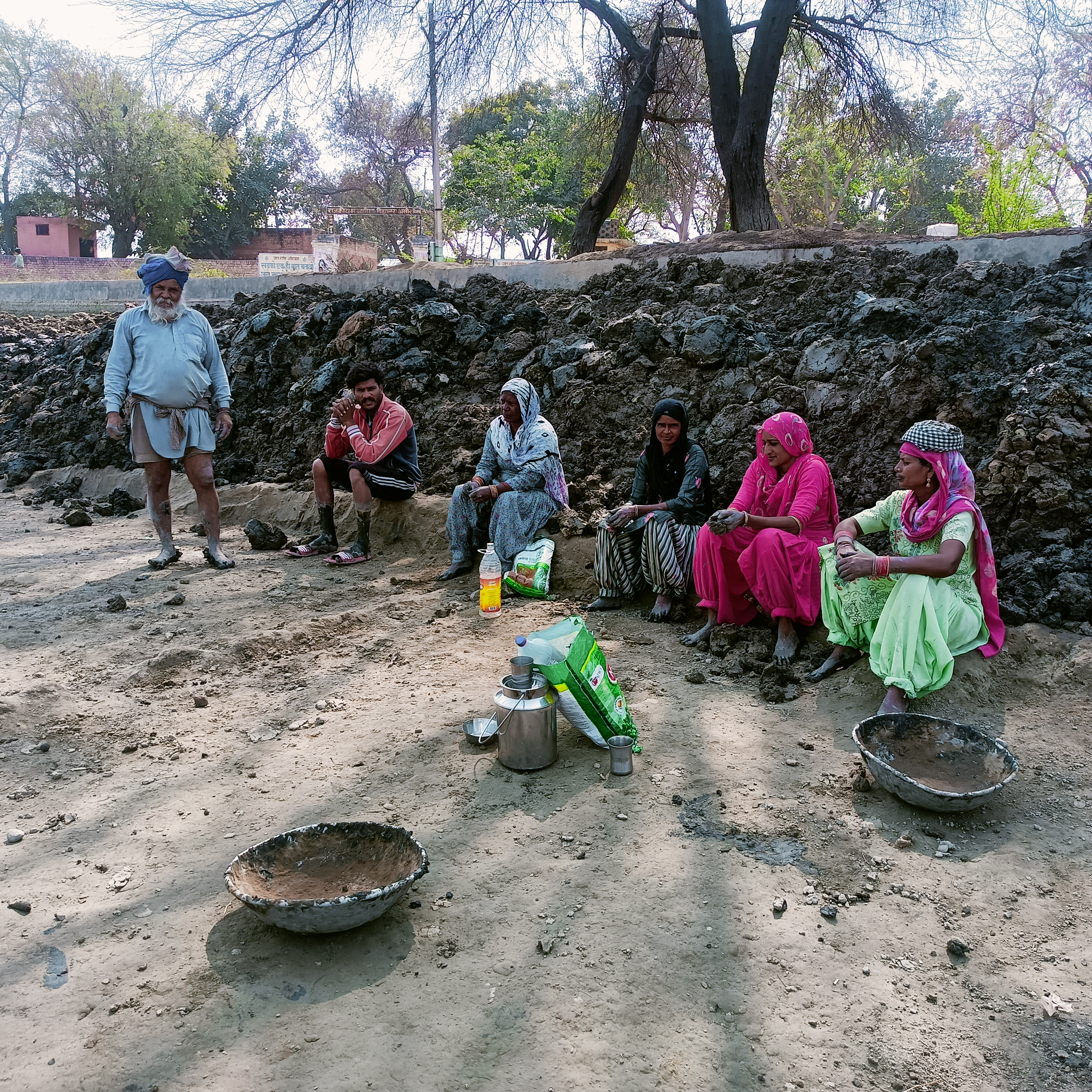
Working women in rest time

Women's work is a field of labour assumed to be solely the realm of women and associated with specific stereotypical jobs considered as uniquely feminine or domestic duties throughout history. It is most commonly used in reference to the unpaid labor typically performed by that of a mother or wife to upkeep the home and children.

Women's work is generally unpaid or paid less than "men's work" and is not as highly valued as "men's work". Much of women's work is not included in official statistics on labour, making much of the work that women typically do virtually invisible. For example, throughout much of the 20th century, the women working on a family farm, no matter how much work they did, would be counted in, for example, the US census as being unemployed, whereas the men doing the same or even less work were counted as being employed as farmers. Similarly, many acts of creativity, such as tapestry, quilting, sewing, and weaving, which are often performed by women, have been traditionally undervalued by the mainstream art world, classified as women's work and thus, until recently, rarely included in art exhibitions, galleries or museums.

In contrast to women's work, "men's work" involves the usage of physical strength or work outdoors, also considered macro power which is defined as public sphere power; mechanical, electrical or electronic knowledge and skill; employment ("bread-winning", "bringing home the bacon"); most dealings with money; or higher reasoning to perform tasks. "Men's work" is higher paid and is viewed to have greater value. Among some people, men's work is considered to be the opposite of "women's work" and thus does not include activities within the home or with children, though "men's work" traditionally includes work that involves both (such as repairing appliances and disciplining children).

== Types ==
There are several types of work that are considered women's work; they involve child care, housework, and occupations such as nursing that have been dominated by women in recent decades.

=== Child care ===
The term "women's work" may indicate a role with children as defined by nature in that only women are biologically capable of performing them: pregnancy, childbirth, and breastfeeding. It may also refer to professions that involve these functions: midwife and wet nurse. "Women's work" may also refer to roles in raising children, particularly within the home: diaper changing and related hygiene, toilet training, bathing, clothing, feeding, monitoring, and education with regard to personal care.

=== Women-dominated industries ===
Women's work may also refer to professions that include childcare such as governess, nanny, day care worker, au pair, or professional positions such as teacher (especially teaching children) and nurse.

=== House work and home production ===
"Women's work" may also refer to roles related to housekeeping, such as cooking, sewing, ironing, and cleaning. It may also refer to professions that include these functions, such as maid and cook. Though much of "women's work" is indoors, some is outdoors, such as fetching water, grocery shopping or food foraging, and gardening.

Until the Industrial Revolution, society was primarily agrarian and women were just as involved in working on farms as men.

A proverbial couplet runs: "Man may work from sun to sun, But woman's work is never done".

Related concepts include gender roles, wage labour and employment, female workforce, and women's rights (cf. gender roles and feminism). The term may be pejorative, because historical advertisements have promoted the misrepresentation of women as only house maids.

Many working women juggle a 'double-day shift,' which includes balancing a full-time job with full-time household responsibilities, a convention still prevalent in modern workplaces. The labor undertaken by women within the household is frequently overlooked and undervalued.

== Effects of women's work on women and girls ==
Women's work and therefore women themselves can be "rendered invisible" in situations in which women's work is a supportive role to "men's work". For example, in peace negotiations, terms and language used may refer to 'combatants' to indicate the army in question. This use of language fails to recognize the supportive roles that women fill as contracted people of the army such as army cooks.

In places where water needs to be collected and transported by hand and brought back to the household, women are found to do a large percentage of this chore. For example, In Sub-Saharan Africa, women make up 62% of the number of people who are responsible for water collection and transportation. Girls make up another 9% of those who fulfill water collection and transportation responsibilities. Men contribute 23% to water collection and transportation with boys responsible for 6% of the chore. The gender distribution of water collection and transportation greater impacts women and girls by contributing to "Time Poverty". This makes it more difficult for them to find the time to participate in activities such as "schooling, paid work...or leisure".

== Women in men's work ==
Women who are in jobs or positions that are predominantly viewed as "men's work" may masculinize themselves in order to be viewed as rightly in that job or position. For example, it was found that "Hillary Clinton's language became more masculinized the higher she climbed the political ladder".

=== In politics ===
Women are making significant strides in terms of their presence in the political field. The number of women being elected into government positions is increasing, and they are proving to be a significant voting demographic. There are still significant changes to be made in regard to women being seen as equals in the political sector however, as there are deeply routed gender stereotypes embedded in our institutions which view politics as a "masculine" field of work. The 2008 presidential campaign was seen to be a pivotal moment for women's participation in politics. Hillary Clinton was the first woman to run for president who was seen as a true contender, and Sarah Palin was the first Republican woman vice-president nominee. Both women however faced many criticisms on their political ability due to gender stereotypes. Clinton for example, was often deemed as being too cold and "unlikeable" to be president. In contrast, Palin was often accused of not being intelligent enough, or being too pretty to participate in politics. It was also often questioned whether she would be too busy with motherhood to fully dedicate herself to being vice-president. Gender biases and stereotypes as such, are the reality for women participating in politics, or what has been considered as "men's work". These gendered ideals of labour can be looked to as a significant contributing factor to the underrepresentation of women in politics.

=== In STEM ===
The Global Gender Gap Index compared to the female share of STEM degrees in different countries.

Only 28% of the STEM workforce is made up by women. In early education, there are approximately an equal number of boys and girls who take math and science courses. However, the number of women who choose to further their studies in science or math in post secondary school drops significantly. A contributing factor to this is the implicit bias that science and math fields are typically seen as "male", while arts and humanities are more often seen as "female". This bias not only impacts the ways people view women in these fields, but it also creates an inner bias where women are less likely to pursue a career in science or math.

There is often also a negative association with women who partake in "men's work". Unless a woman is quite obviously successful in their job, they are often seen as less competent than men in these "male" positions. In contrast, if a woman is competent and successful in a job that is considered to be more "masculine", then she is much less likely to be viewed as likeable. Both likeability and competence are needed to be truly successful in these fields, which creates another barrier in having a proportionate number of women to men in the STEM fields.

== See also ==
- Sexual division of labour
- Housewife or stay-at-home mother
- Women in firefighting
- Female astronauts
- Maternalism
- Distaff, a tool of spinning used metaphorically to indicate female matters
