= Karen J. Warren =

Author and philosopher (1947–2020)

- Born: September 10, 1947; USA
- Died: August 21, 2020 (aged 72)

Philosophical work
- Era: 20th-/21st-century philosophy
- Region: Western philosophy
- School: Ecofeminism
- Main interests: Ethics · Ecofeminism · Critical Thinking
- Notable ideas: Ecofeminism · Connections between the subordination of women and others, and the subordination of the environment.

Karen J. Warren (September 10, 1947 – August 21, 2020) was an author, scholar, and former professor and chair of philosophy at Macalester College.

== Biography ==
Karen Warren received her B.A. in philosophy from the University of Minnesota (1970) and her Ph.D. from the University of Massachusetts-Amherst in 1978. Before her long tenure at Macalester College, which began in 1985, Warren was Professor of Philosophy at St. Olaf College in the early 1980s.

Warren was the Ecofeminist-Scholar-in-Residence at Murdoch University in Australia. In 2003, she served as an Oxford University Round Table Scholar and as Women's Chair in Humanistic Studies at Marquette University in 2004. She ha spoke widely on environmental issues, feminism, critical thinking skills and peace studies in many international locations including Buenos Aires, Gothenburg, Helsinki, Oslo, Manitoba, Melbourne, Moscow, Perth, the U.N. Earth Summit in Rio de Janeiro (1992), and San Jose.

Warren donated her body to the University of Minnesota Anatomy Bequest Program for medical education and research. She was also a supporter of the Lou Ruvo Center for Brain Research and their work to understand Parkinson's disease and MSA.

== Public philosophy ==
Warren was a believer in allowing public access into the academic field of philosophy and described herself as a "street philosopher." "I believe philosophy is relevant to people of all ages, in all cultural, geographical, and socioeconomic contexts," she has said.

Warren has taught philosophy in the Berkshire County House of Correction (MA), the Wilderness Society, Eco-Education, Pheasants Forever, Minnesota Naturalists Association and other organizations. As part of her commitment to public philosophy, she has spoken for lay audiences and served as critical thinking consultant to the Science Museum of Minnesota and facilitator of a Women's Issues Book Group at Barnes & Noble Booksellers.

== Publications ==
Warren has written extensively in the fields of critical thinking, environmental ethics and ecofeminism. She has written more than forty articles, edited or co-edited five anthologies, and authored Ecofeminist Philosophy: A Western Perspective on What It Is and Why It Matters (2000). She is also the author of a groundbreaking anthology, An Unconventional History of Western Philosophy: Conversations Between Men and Women Philosophers (Rowman & Littlefield, 2009). The anthology explores 2600 years of Western philosophy, juxtaposing leading men and women philosophers' writing on ethics, metaphysics and other topics.

Her work has been translated into Spanish, Mandarin, French, Japanese and Persian.
