= Simone Iff =

French activist for women's rights and reproductive health

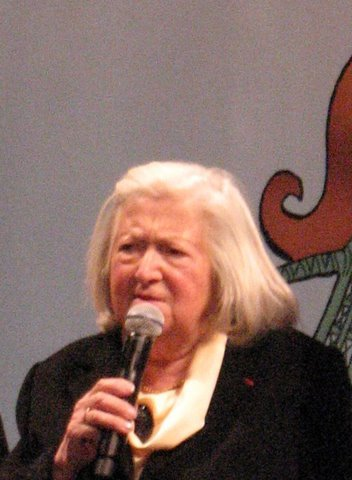
- Born: Simone Balfet; September 4, 1924; Vabre, France
- Died: December 29, 2014 (aged 90); Paris
- Occupation(s): activist for women's rights and reproductive health
- Years active: 1946 - 1984

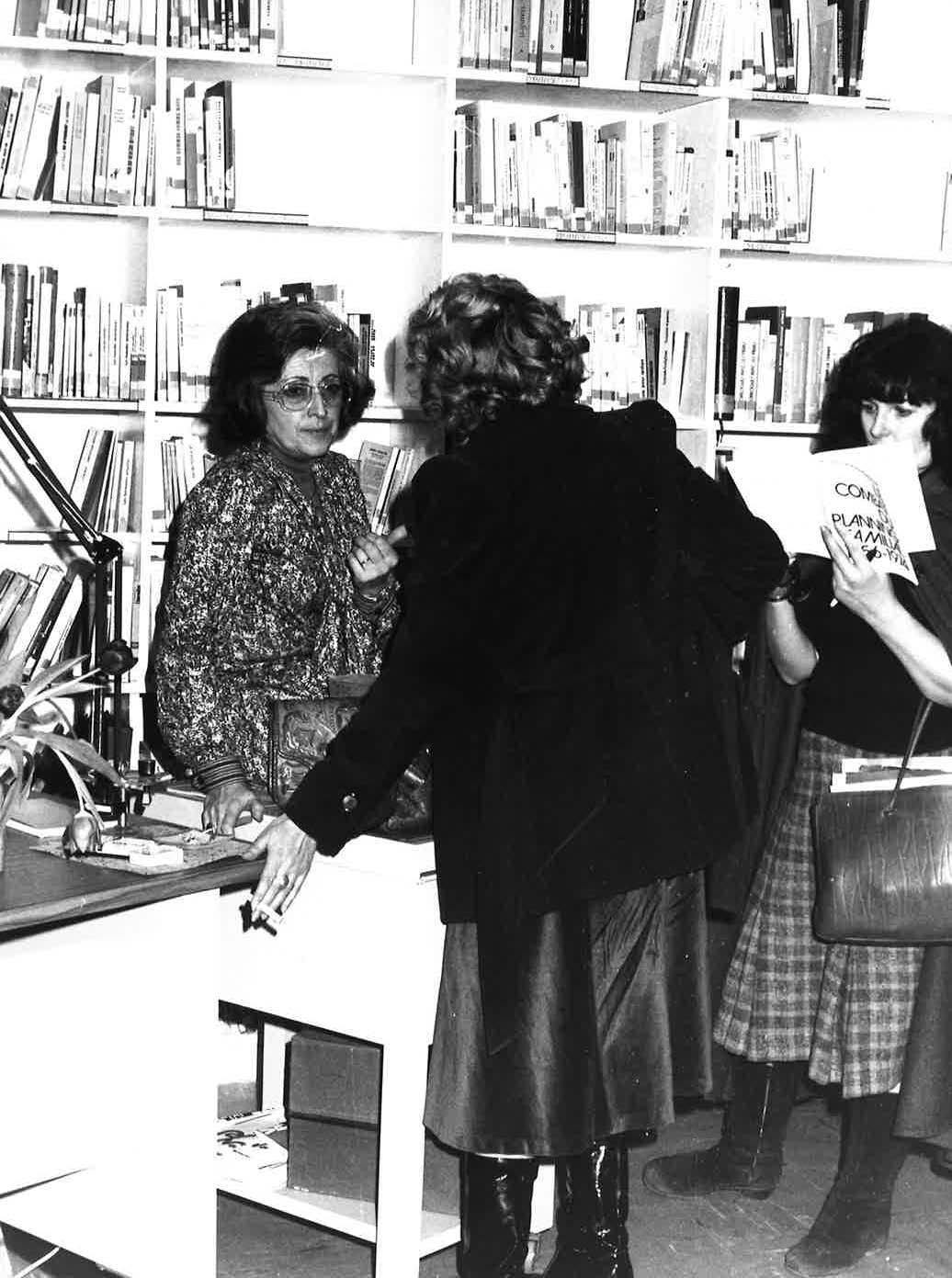
Simone Iff in 1977

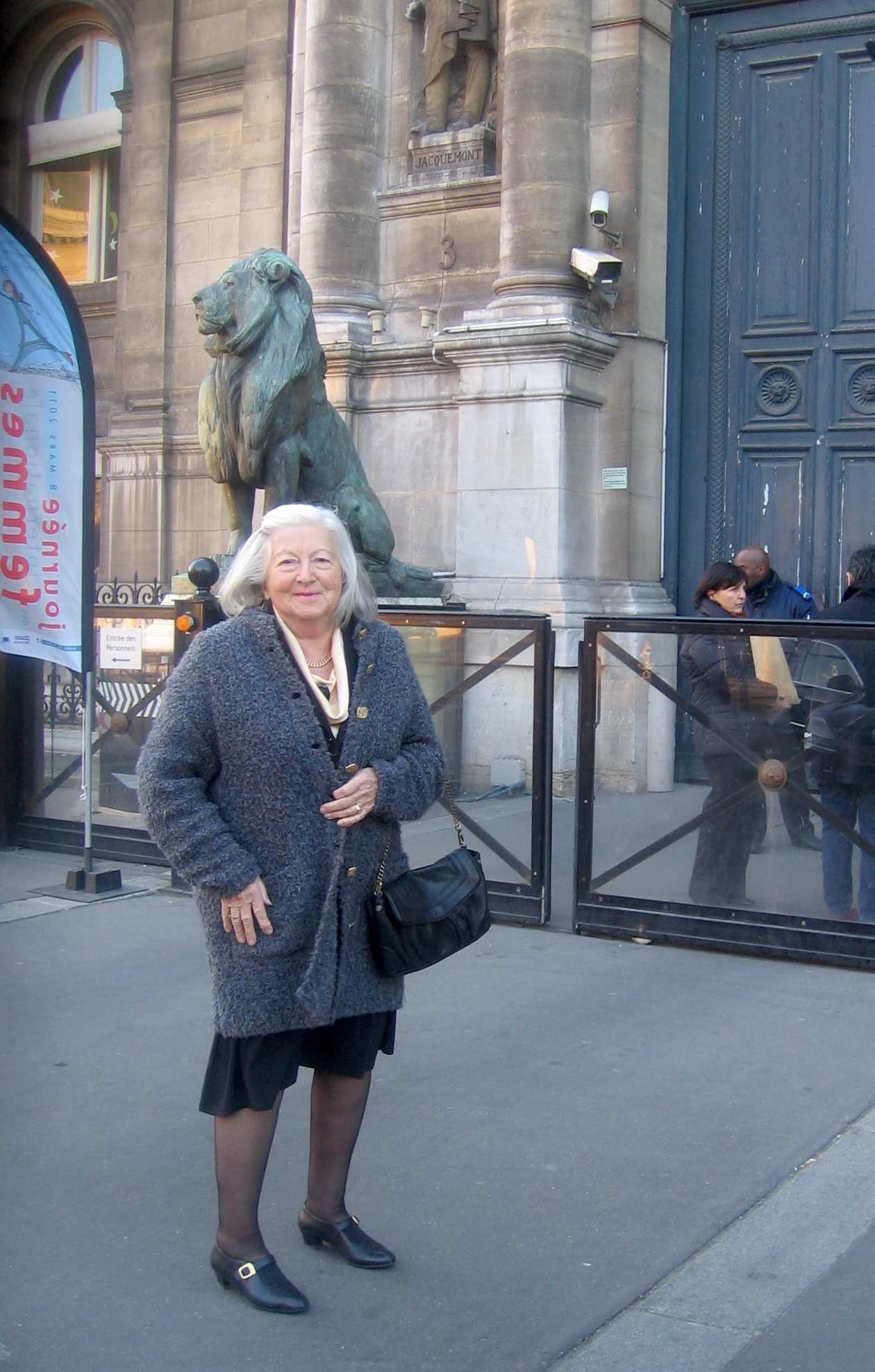
Simone Iff before receiving the Medal of the City of Paris in 2011

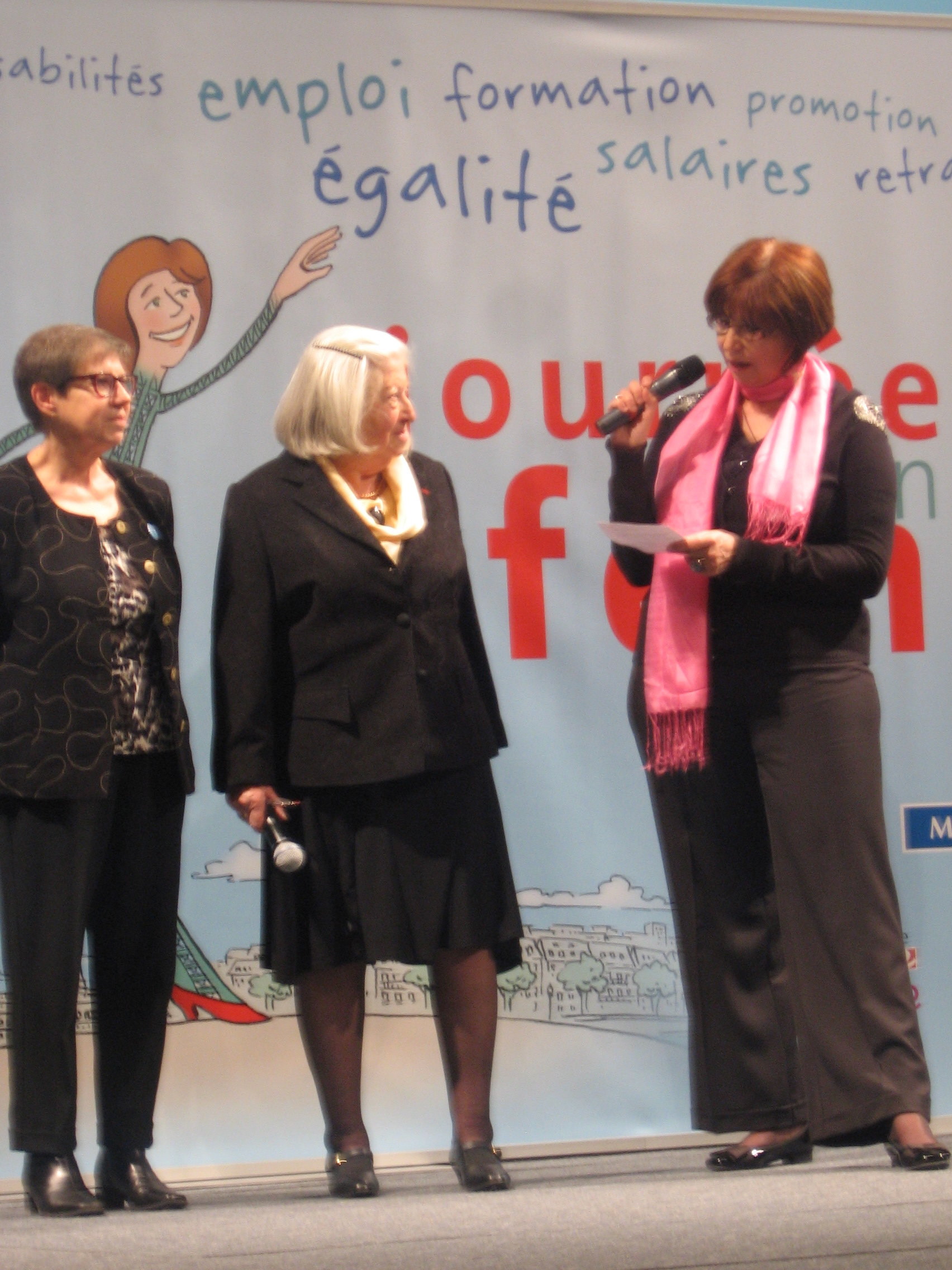
Simone Iff receiving the Medal of the City of Paris, March 8th, 2011

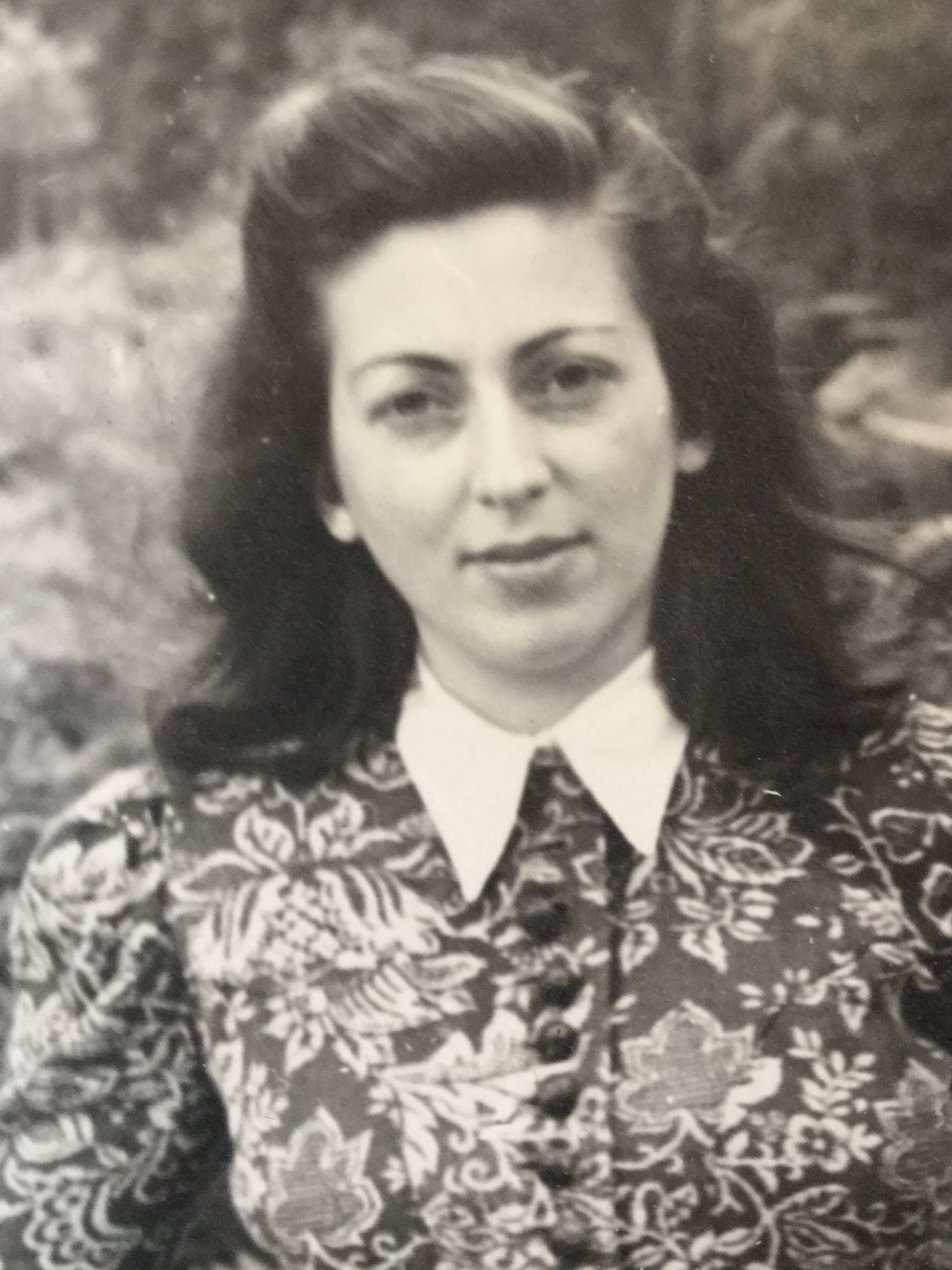
The young Simone Iff

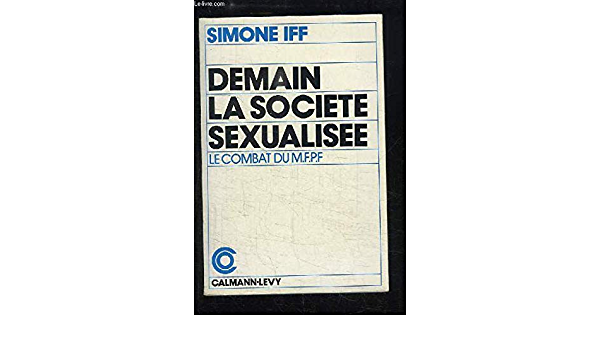
Book written by Simone Iff, Demain la société sexualisée (Tomorrow, a Sexualised Society), published by Calmann-Levy, 1975

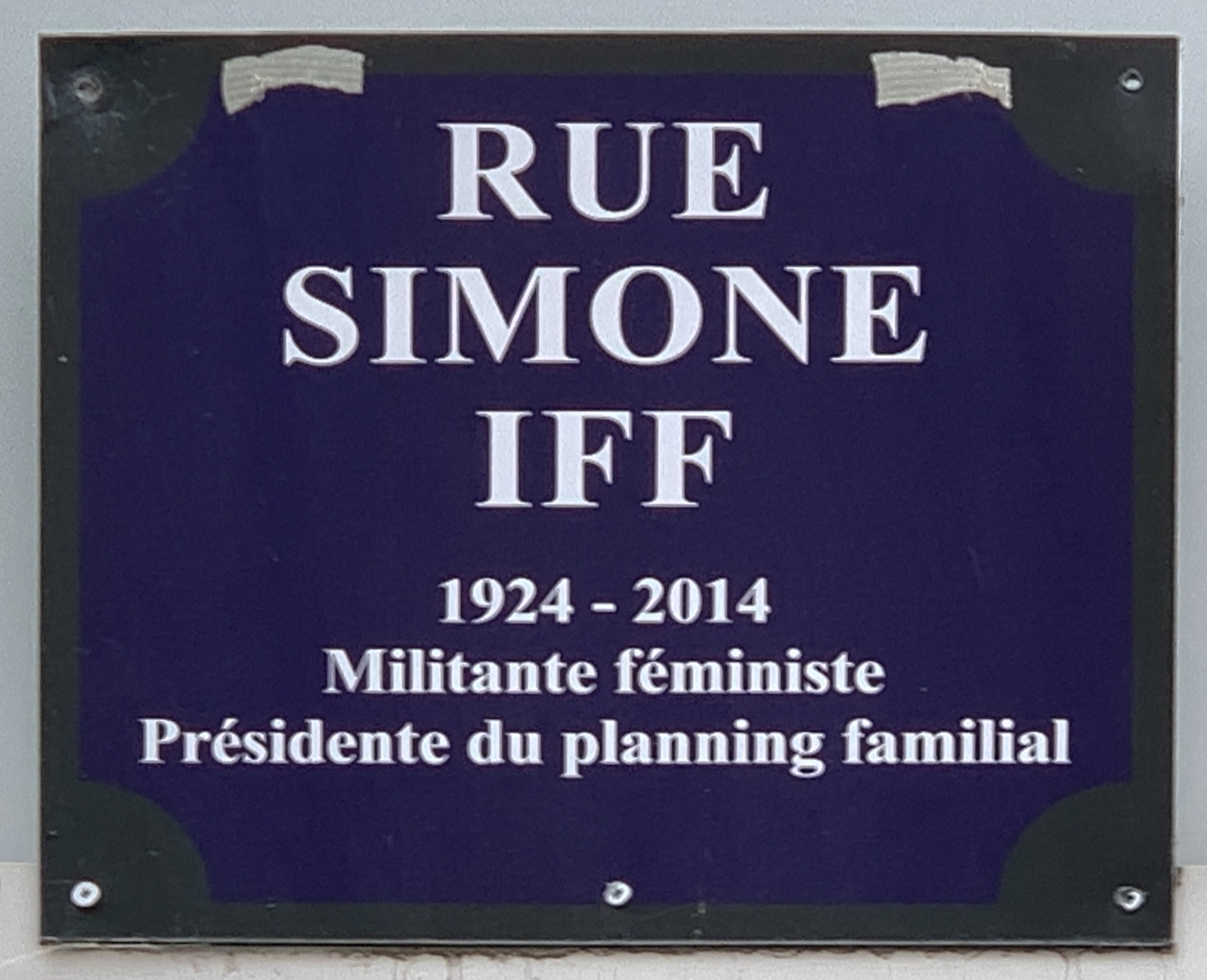
Street plaque with Simone Iff's name, Paris 75012

Simone Iff, née Simone Balfet, (4 September 1924 - 29 December 2014) was a French activist noted for her advocacy for women's rights and reproductive health. She is noted for her 30 years of activism for the legalization of contraception and abortion in France. Further, Iff was a founding member of the French Family Planning Movement (Mouvement Français pour le Planning Familial) and served as its president from 1969 to 1973.

== Biography ==
=== Early life ===
Simone Balfet was born in the southern French department of Tarn in 1924, the daughter of a protestant pastor and of a mother who had graduated from the Ècole normale supérieure in Sèvres. Her parents brought her up in a spirit of activism and social protests. At age 18, when she got pregnant without being married, her family preferred to leave their home in Sète to escape the scandal, but her parents remained close to her. The following year, she married Werner Iff, the Swiss father of her son.

=== Career ===
==== Activism for family planning ====
In 1946, Simone Iff joined the Mouvement Jeunes Femmes (MJF), whose aim was to enable married Protestant women to put their Christian convictions into practice and to feel solidarity with each other. Participation in this movement helped Iff to gain experience in public speaking. Within this movement, a growing demand for information on birth control emerged, at a time when the subject of women's sexuality remained taboo. Simone Iff took on responsibilities in this movement from 1958 to 1966 and remained a member until 1972.

Around 1961, she joined the French Movement for Family Planning (MFPF, a member of the International Planned Parenthood Federation) and encouraged members of the Mouvement Jeunes Femmes to join as well. The aims of the MFPF were officially to promote the psychological wellbeing of couples and the health of women, but above all, although implicitly, to answer the many questions about birth control, as information on this subject remained prohibited by a law going back to 1920.

In 1961, the first family planning centers opened in Grenoble and Paris, and quickly became very popular. In 1963, Simone Iff trained to become one of the first counsellors at the Paris office. She understood birth control as related to the sexual act as a source of pleasure and fulfilled sexuality. The social and political context was tense, and the police were raiding family planning centres to check that the counsellors were not spreading information about contraception. The files of the clients had to be concealed. In 1967, the Neuwirth law partially repealed the 1920 legislative provisions and authorized the use of contraceptives. But the implementation of the law would not be achieved by official decree until 1972.

===== Activism for the right of abortion =====
The political context of the post-1968 years fueled the process of radicalization of the MFPF, and the counsellors, led by Simone Iff, increasingly opposed the physicians on the movement's board of directors. Rather, Iff and her colleagues were advocating free contraception and abortion to be covered by the public health services. Abortion was still illegal, and women who needed one, had to go abroad or have it done clandestinely, with the risk of losing their lives. From 1970 until 1973, Iff became general secretary of the Parisian section of the French Movement for Family Planning, where she helped to organize the training of counsellors, alongside that of doctors.

In 1971, the Manifesto of the 343, for which Iff collected signatures without however signing it herself, was publicized by the media, mobilizing public opinion. That same year, she joined the national office of the MFPF as one of its five vice-presidents. She was also working with the Mouvement de libération des femmes on the issue of abortion.

In 1973, she co-founded and became vice-president of the Movement for the Freedom of Abortion and Contraception (MLAC) continuing to demand free and unrestricted abortion within a larger policy of family planning. Her status as a mother of 5 children, claiming to have had several abortions, gave her credibility for such demands. This allowed her, in June 1973, to become elected the first president of the MFPF who did not come from the medical profession. In 1975, Iff supported the so-called Veil Act, which seemed to approach abortion only from a health perspective, wanting to avoid clandestine abortions, but which turned out to be a considerable step forward. That same year Iff left the MLAC, as the national office dissolved itself.

After François Mitterrand's victory in the 1981 French presidential election, Iff became a technical advisor in the office of Yvette Roudy, Minister for Women's Affairs, whom she had known for a long time. There, she obtained a ruling for abortions covered by publicly funded health care in 1982 and fought for enough places for voluntary terminations of pregnancy in hospitals. In 1984, she became a member of the Economic and Social Council.

In 1986, she founded the Feminist Collective Against Rape and chaired it until 1992.

She was named Knight of the Legion of Honor in 1986, and received the Medal of the City of Paris on March 8th, 2011.

== Death ==
Iff died on 29 December 2014 in her home of the 13e arrondissement of Paris, remaining in close contact with the Movement for Family Planning until the end. Upon her death, numerous tributes were paid to her by feminist movements and by two federal ministers, Najat Vallaud-Belkacem and Marisol Touraine.

== Publication ==
- Simone Iff; Marcel Besse; Werner Iff (1975). Demain la société sexualisée. Le combat du Mouvement français pour le planning familial (in French). Calmann-Lévy. ISBN 978-2-7021-7894-2.

== Sources ==
- Poujol, Geneviève (2003). Un féminisme sous tutelle (in French). Éditions de Paris. ISBN 978-2-84621-031-7.
- Bard, Christine; Mossuz-Lavau, Janine (2007). Le planning familial (in French). Presses Universitaires de Rennes.
- Garcia, Sandrine (2011). Mères sous influence : De la cause des femmes à la cause des enfants (in French). La Découverte. ISBN 978-2-7071-6731-6..
