= Françoise d'Eaubonne et l'écoféminisme =

2019 non-fiction book by Caroline Goldblum

First edition

Françoise d'Eaubonne et l'écoféminisme is a book written by Caroline Goldblum and published in 2019 by Passager Clandestin. The book appeared in the context of renewed interest in ecofeminism in France and the republishing of essays by Françoise d'Eaubonne, including “Écologie et féminisme, révolution ou mutation ?" in 2018 and “Le Féminisme ou la mort" (Feminism or death) in 2020. It aims to understand the foundation of d’Eaubonne's conception of ecofeminism and is the first book dedicated exclusively to the subject.

== The Author ==
Caroline Goldblum discovered the first ecofeminist theorist Françoise d’Eaubonne while working for the French feminist journal “Sorcière”, created by Xavière Gauthier in 1974. Becoming passionate about the vast work of the pioneer of ecofeminist and degrowth theories, Goldblum initially wrote a thesis on Françoise d’Eaubonne. She also participated in several publications on d'Eaubonne. In her book, Goldblum explores the ecofeminist thought of d'Eaubonne, poorly known in France because of an intellectual attachment to Beauvoirian feminism and a rejection of d'Eaubonne's radical positions and use of violence

== Book Content ==
The book starts by examining the political commitments of Françoise d’Eaubonne, who believed that all causes are linked and intertwined. This was the reason for her support of communism and the independence of Algeria, her opposition to psychiatry, and also her advocacy for women's rights and those of sexual minorities. An activist for gay rights and co-founder of the Front homosexuel d'action révolutionnaire, d'Eaubonne is characterized by the author as a "faghag"

D'Eaubonne's engagement with feminism started in her childhood, but evolved significantly with the publication of 'The Second Sex' in 1949 and her friendship with its author, the feminist philosopher Simone de Beauvoir, for whom she wrote: “Une Femme nommée Castor : mon amie Simone de Beauvoir”. In 1970, she took part in the Mouvement de libération des femmes, during which time she began reflect on ecology and feminism within the Écologie-féminisme centre group. Four years later, in 1974, she published her first book on ecofeminism, 'Le féminisme ou la mort' and became the first person to use and theorize the notion of ecofeminism. She advanced the idea that the oppression of women and the destruction of the environment have a common origin, patriarchal capitalism. According to her ecofeminist theory, men have taken power over the fertility of land and of women's bodies, both of which they dominate. This association is based on The Limits to Growth, a 1972 report which exposed the consequences of overpopulation and economic growth on the earth's resources. The political project of d’Eaubonne to some extent echoes Malthusianism as she defends the idea that women should stop getting pregnant and calls for a procreation strike

In the book, Goldblum agrees with the assertions of French authors such as Emilie Hache and Jeanne Burgart-Goutal that Françoise d’Eaubonne's ecofeminism project had more success in English-speaking countries than in the author's native France due to links with the anti-nuclear and anti-militarist movements during the Cold War. She also produces her own cartography of ecofeminism by distinguishing the materialist ecofeminism upheld by Maria Mies and Vandana Shiva from spiritual ecofeminism reclaimed by the neo-pagan witch Starhawk. According to the author, the work of Mies and Shiva has several similarities with that of d'Eaubonne, as they all denounce the consequences of patriarchal capitalism. Nonetheless, this is contrasted with spiritual ecofeminism, which values the reappropriation of spirituality and religion, leading to criticism of its potentially essentialist nature

== Selected texts ==
The last section of the book is composed of a selection of texts that illustrate both d'Eaubonne's ecofeminist thinking and critiques of economic growth theories. The texts, chosen by Goldblum from d'Eaubonne's novels, essays and activist documents, allow the reader to dive into her political project and philosophical approach.

The first selection deals with ecofeminism and highlights d'Eaubonne's thoughts on the demographic explosion, the importance of a procreation strike to abolish the patriarchal and sexist system, and on women's role in the environmental crisis.

The second selection explores degrowth theories and develops critical thinking towards theories of economic growth that d'Eaubonne associates with a chaotic system of domination and inequality.
