= Abortion in France =

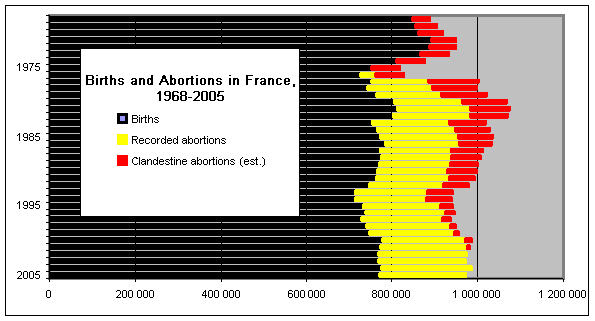
Births, legal abortions, and clandestine abortions in France between 1968 and 2005

Abortion in France is legal upon request until 14 weeks after conception (16 weeks after the pregnant woman's last menstrual period). Abortions at later stages of pregnancy up until birth are allowed if two physicians certify that the abortion will be done to prevent injury to the physical or mental health of the pregnant woman; a risk to the life of the pregnant woman; or that the child will suffer from a particularly severe illness recognized as incurable. The abortion law was liberalized by the Veil Act in 1975.

It is also known as induced abortion or voluntary termination of pregnancy, and refers to the deliberate termination of a pregnancy at the request of a pregnant woman who does not wish to continue the pregnancy.

== History ==
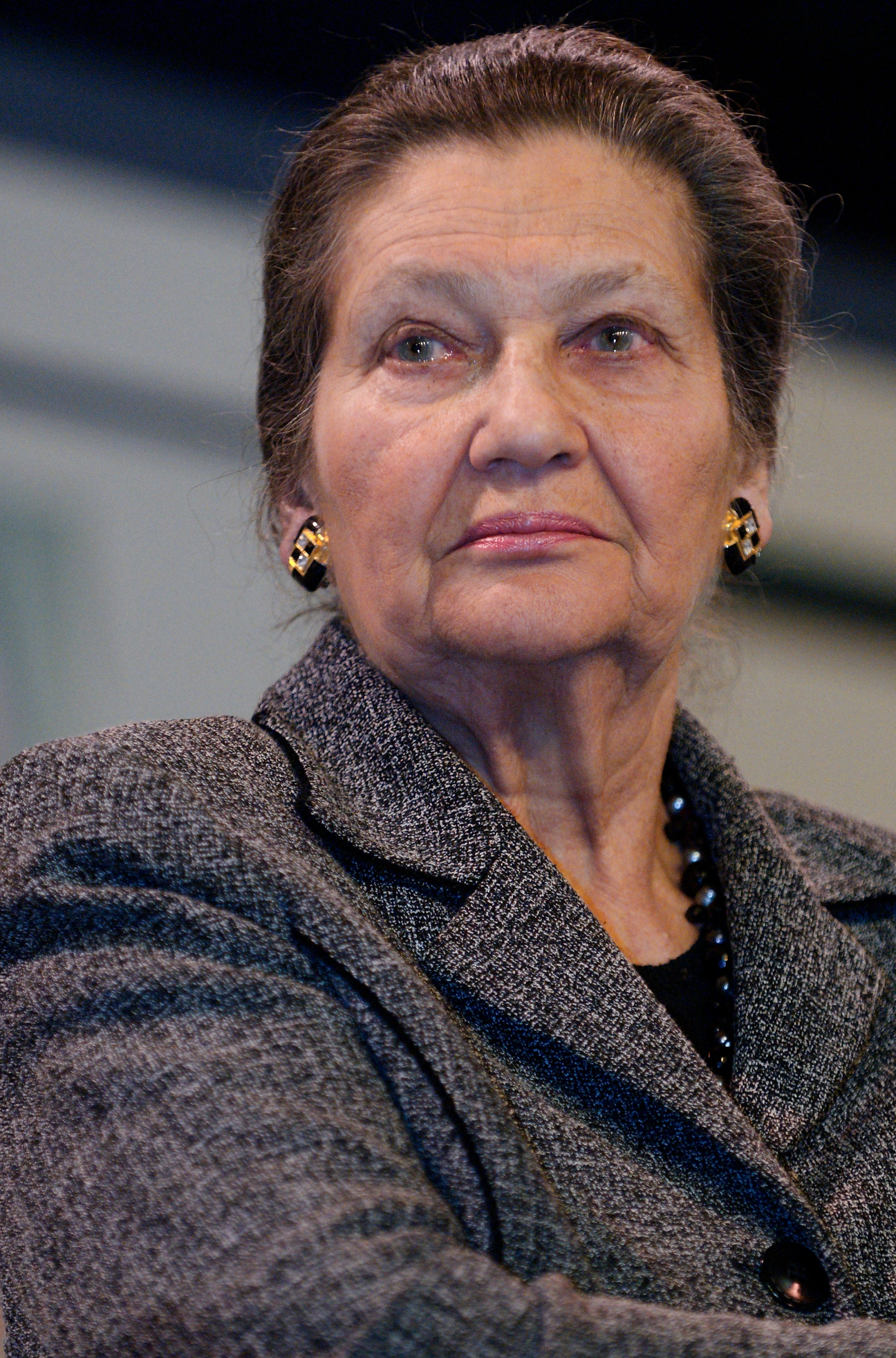
Simone Veil, a key figure in the legalization of abortion in 1975

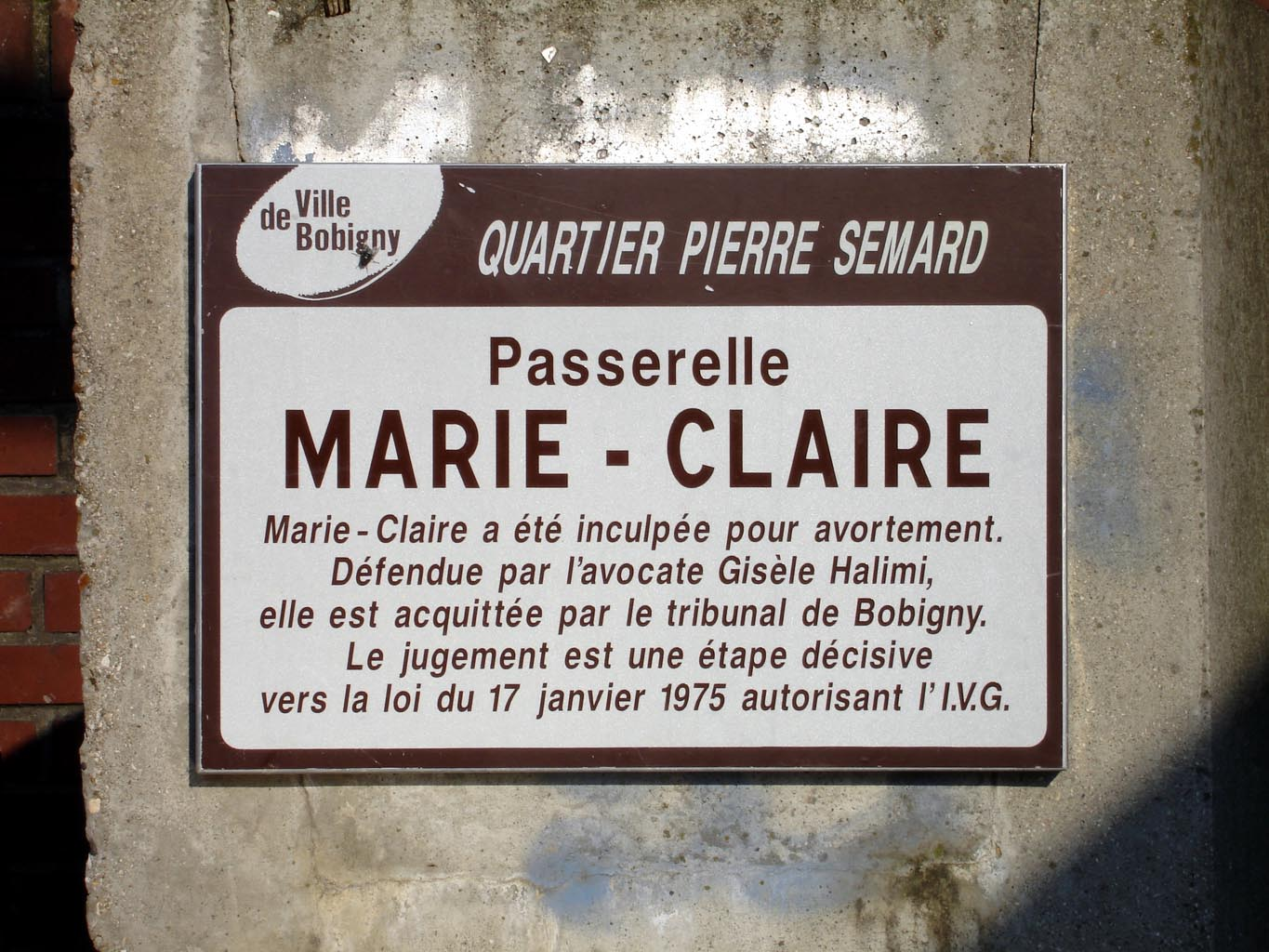
Passerelle Marie-Claire, in memory of a 1972 trial that ended with the acquittal of an "abortionist", and eventually led to the 1975 law which legalized the procedure

The First French Republic saw the act of abortion being changed from an act punishable by death to a felony with a sentence of up to 20 years in prison. When the 1810 Napoleonic Code was introduced as a revision of the French Penal Code of 1791, as well as the Code of Offences and Penalties of 1795, abortion retained its felony status. Alongside this, the new penal code made it more difficult for women to divorce their husbands.

In 1920, new abortion laws prohibited the act of abortion, as well as the use of contraception, on the grounds of needing new babies to make up for the loss of population caused by World War I and to boost the birth rate of France that had been considerably lower than other European countries for over a century. The introduction of the Law of 27 March 1923 stated that whoever induced a miscarriage was punished with up to 5 years imprisonment, as well as a fine of up to 10,000 FF, while the woman having the abortion could be imprisoned for up to 3 years.

Just a month before the invasion of Poland, the Penal Code was altered to permit abortions, but only in the instance where the mother's life was in danger. However, with the German Occupation and the implementation of the Vichy Government, abortion was made a capital crime, punishable by death, in the Law of 15 February 1942. The last person to be executed for abortion was Marie-Louise Giraud, a faiseuse d'anges (French slang; literally, "maker of angels") who performed abortions in the region of Cherbourg. For her assisted abortions, she was sentenced to death by guillotine on 30 July 1943.

Following the Liberation of Paris in 1944, the death penalty for abortion was abolished, but abortion continued to be prosecuted vigorously. Illegal abortion rates remained fairly high during the post-war period, and increasing numbers of women began to travel to the United Kingdom to procure abortions after the UK legalized abortion in 1967.

During the period of civil unrest during and after the events of May 1968, a new civil rights movement was becoming prominent throughout the media, campaigning for more equal rights and opportunities for women. The Mouvement de Libération des Femmes's ("The Women's Liberation Front") main goal was to advocate for women's right of autonomy from their husbands, as well as rights that pertained to the use of contraception and legalization of abortion.

In 1971, the "Manifesto of the 343", an open letter and petition, was written by Simone de Beauvoir and published in Le Nouvel observateur. It included the signatures of 343 women who admitted to having had an illegal abortion (punishable by up to 10 years in prison at the time). The petition included the names of many famous female personalities, including Jeanne Moreau and Catherine Deneuve. The manifesto aimed to highlight the prevalence of abortion in French society, despite its clandestine nature, as well as to call for abortion to be made legal, to provide more safe and hygienic spaces for women who want to have an abortion. Later the same year, lawyer Gisèle Halimi, herself one of the 343 women, formed her own group, Choisir ("To Choose"), which worked to protect those who had signed the petition.

In 1975, La Loi Veil ("The Veil Act") was passed, decriminalizing abortion in France. The law was introduced by the presiding Health Minister Simone Veil, under Valéry Giscard d'Estaing. D'Estaing had promised to decriminalize abortion during his campaign; however, Jean Lecanuet, then Minister of Justice, refused to defend the law on personal and ethical grounds, and so, it was up to Veil to prepare the law for vote. The debate that preceded the eventual passing of the vote was accompanied by violent attacks and demonstrations comparing Veil, a concentration camp survivor, with Hitler. In her speech before the National Assembly on 26 November 1974, Veil declared the need for the legalization of abortion, to bring equality in France, as well as explaining to the majority-male assembly that current French law did not protect women who were suffering from the social exclusion and shame as a result of illegal abortions, as well as the after-effects that led to illnesses (such as sepsis) and even death, calling for the law to offer them protection with a change of law to legalize abortions.

The Veil Act (Law 75–17 of 15 January 1975), permitted a woman to receive an abortion on request until the tenth week of pregnancy. This was a temporary law with a sunset clause after 5 years. The law was renewed permanently in December 1979.

Since 1982, much of the costs of abortions have been taken into charge by the French social security system, which allows women in France to access abortion free of charge. France was the first country to legalize the use of Mifepristone as an abortifacient in 1988, allowing its use up to seven weeks of pregnancy under the supervision of a physician, while vacuum aspiration is used for up to 12 weeks.

== 21st century liberalization ==
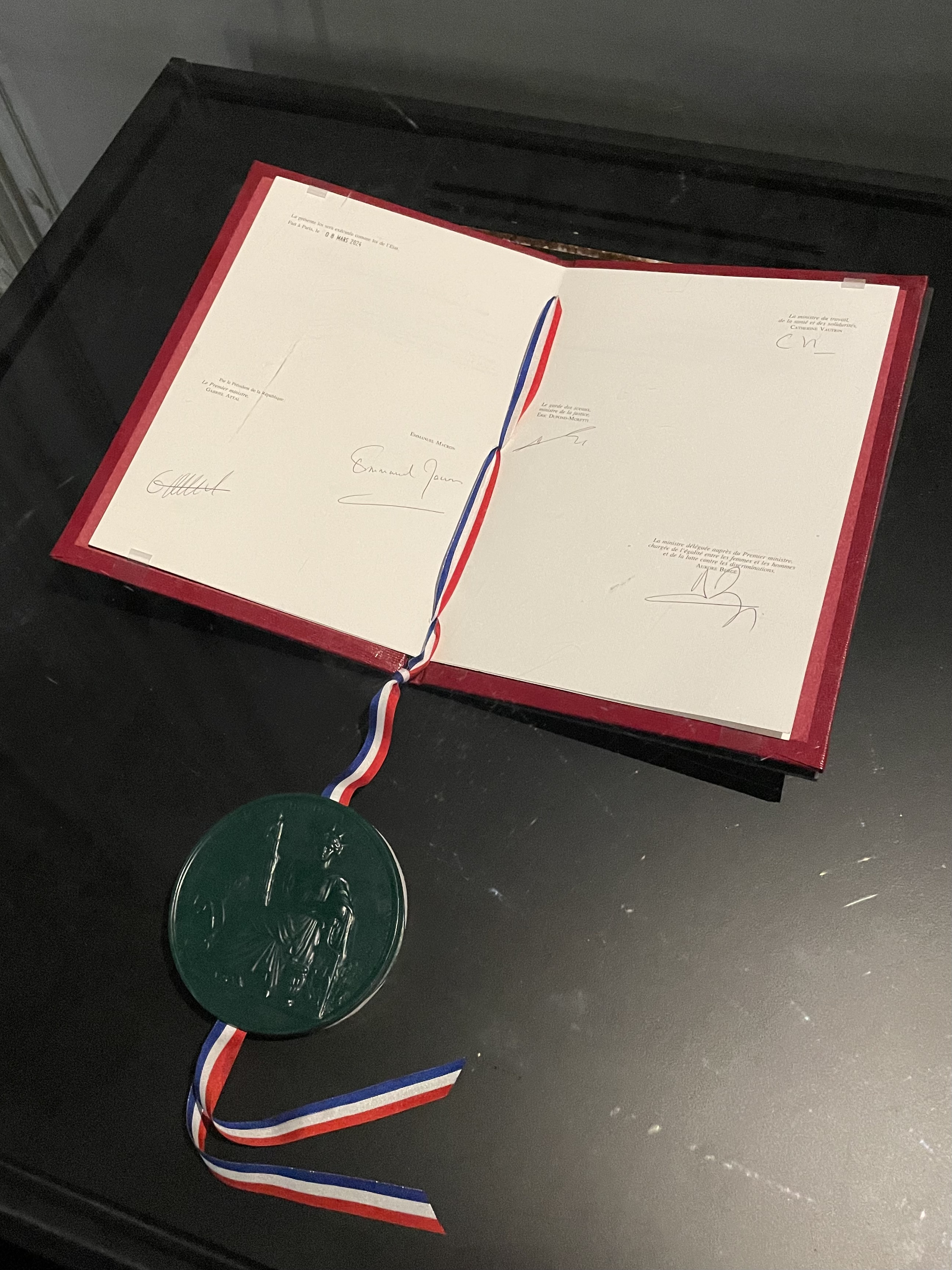
The 8 March 2024 amendment to the Constitution of France granting constitutional protection to the right to an abortion.

Several reforms took place in the 21st century, further liberalizing access to abortion. The ten-week limit was extended to the twelfth week in 2001, and it was extended to fourteen weeks in 2022. Also since 2001, minors no longer need mandatory parental consent. A pregnant girl under the age of 18 may ask for an abortion without consulting her parents first if she is accompanied to the clinic by an adult of her choice, who must not tell her parents or any third party about the abortion. Until 2015, the law imposed a seven-day "cool-off" period between the patient's first request for an abortion and a written statement confirming her decision (the delay could be reduced to two days if the patient was getting close to 12 weeks). That mandatory waiting period was abolished on 9 April 2015.

In reaction to the Supreme Court of the United States's Dobbs v. Jackson Women's Health Organization ruling, Mathilde Panot, the leader of the La France insoumise group in the National Assembly, introduced a bill for an amendment adding the right to a safe abortion to the Constitution. It passed on a 337–32 vote on 24 November 2023. However, a private member's bill for a constitutional amendment needs to be approved by referendum; in order to avoid one, the government introduced a similar bill in December. It was passed 433–30 by the lower house in January and by the Senate 267–50 in February.

The amendment, which takes the form of a one-line addition to article 34 (the list of matters on which Parliament may legislate), was given final approval in a congress (joint session) of Parliament on 4 March 2024, in a 780 to 72 vote. It was signed into law by President Emmanuel Macron on 8 March (International Women's Day). This amendment made France, as of passage, the only nation (and the first) to guarantee the right to an abortion in their constitution. The amendment describes abortion as a "guaranteed freedom"; while Yugoslavia included similar measures in 1974 guaranteeing the right to "decide on having children", the French amendment is the first to explicitly guarantee abortion.

== Medical techniques ==
Two types of medical methods exist for terminating a pregnancy: medication-based and surgical methods. The former does not require hospitalization but is limited to early pregnancies: for example, up to seven weeks of pregnancy under French law, equivalent to nine weeks of amenorrhea. Beyond this period and up to the legal limit for abortion, surgical methods must be used. Surgical abortion is legal up to 14 weeks of pregnancy, or a maximum of 16 weeks from the start of the last menstrual period.

=== Medication-based method ===
The medication-based method can be performed during the first trimester, with the duration depending on the applicable legislation.

Two options exist:

- Mifepristone (RU 486), which has an antiprogestogenic effect, and misoprostol, a prostaglandin E1 analog, increase contractions and facilitate the expulsion of the embryo. Medically, this can be performed up to ten weeks of gestation. The protocol in France typically involves 600 mg of mifepristone followed, 36 to 48 hours later, by 400 μg of misoprostol.
- The use of methotrexate combined with a prostaglandin is effective up to seven weeks of gestation.

The combination of mifepristone and misoprostol results in complete expulsion of the embryo but appears slightly more effective when misoprostol is administered vaginally, achieving a success rate of nearly 95%. However, this finding is debated. The vaginal route is better tolerated.

The main side effects of these medications include significant genital bleeding and various digestive issues. This combination is contraindicated in cases of acute or chronic renal failure, hepatic failure, adrenal insufficiency, severe asthma, chronic obstructive pulmonary disease, anemia, coagulation disorders, cardiovascular history, other contraindications to prostaglandins, allergy to mifepristone, or suspected ectopic pregnancy. Age over 35 or smoking increases cardiovascular risks.

This medication-based technique allows for an abortion to be performed at home and is widely used in the United States.

Taking mifepristone as early as possible, followed 24–48 hours later by buccal or vaginal administration of misoprostol, is 98% effective in the first nine weeks of gestation; between nine and ten weeks, the effectiveness drops to 94%. The regimen (200 mg of mifepristone, followed 24–48 hours later by 800 mcg of vaginal misoprostol) previously used by Planned Parenthood clinics in the United States from 2001 to March 2006 was 98.5% effective through 63 days of gestation—with an ongoing pregnancy rate of about 0.5%, and an additional 1% of women requiring uterine evacuation for various reasons, including problematic bleeding, persistent gestational sac, clinician judgment, or a woman's request. The regimen (200 mg of mifepristone, followed 24–48 hours later by 800 mcg of buccal misoprostol) currently used by Planned Parenthood clinics in the United States since April 2006 is 98% effective through 59 days of gestation.

In case of failure of a medical abortion, a surgical abortion remains an option. However, if the patient chooses to continue the pregnancy after a failed medical abortion, there is a risk of fetal malformation.

In France, any physician performing medical abortions must have an agreement with a healthcare facility authorized to perform abortions. A medical abortion requires at least five medical consultations: two preliminary consultations, one for the administration of mifepristone, one for misoprostol, and a follow-up visit 15 days later. The medication is administered in the presence of a physician, midwife, or nurse in an orthogenic center. An abortion must be performed in a healthcare facility if the pregnant woman wishes to remain anonymous.

=== Surgical method ===
1-Amniotic sac2-Human embryo 3-Uterine lining4-Speculum5-Vaginal cannula 6-Vaginal cannula connected to a suction pump

Abortion under local anesthesia is not painful, except for some women who may experience pain similar to menstrual cramps for a few minutes at the end of the aspiration. However, patients generally prefer general anesthesia (75% versus 20% for local anesthesia in France) to avoid being conscious during the procedure. Both types of anesthesia have equivalent safety, though their complications differ.

The primary surgical method involves aspirating the embryo using a cannula inserted into the uterus after dilation of the cervix and administration of anesthesia, which may be local or general. The success rate of this surgical method is 99.7%.

A simpler aspiration method, requiring neither anesthesia nor cervical dilation, is the Karman method, developed around 1970. This method is safer and faster than curettage or aspiration after dilation.

Curettage (specifically "dilation and curettage") is another surgical method that uses a curette instead of a suction device. This technique, which emerged in the mid-19th century, is increasingly being replaced in developed countries by the safer and more comfortable embryo aspiration method. However, it remains widely used in developing countries and can lead to serious complications (hemorrhages, uterine perforations, infections), sometimes causing infertility or death.

The use of antibiotics (doxycycline) is standard practice, reducing infectious complications from curettage.

The concurrent use of mifepristone or misoprostol softens the cervix and facilitates its dilation.

From the 7th to the 16th week of amenorrhea, abortion can be performed surgically. This method is conducted in a single day and involves aspirating the uterine contents under general anesthesia. At 14 weeks of amenorrhea, the size of the fetus and the solidification of its head make aspiration impossible. It becomes necessary to dismember the fetus and reduce its head in utero.

For example, in Canada, the procedure takes approximately 15 to 30 minutes, followed by about one hour of rest at the clinic.

=== Risks and medical follow-up ===
Regardless of the chosen technique, there are risks that the patient must be informed about. In the case of clandestine abortions, the risks are more numerous and often have more severe consequences. In a favorable context, medical follow-up is also in place to address potential physical risks. For medical abortion, risks include hemorrhage, infection, failure, and side effects of the medications (pain, nausea, vomiting). For surgical abortion, there are risks inherent to any surgical procedure, including a 1% chance of uterine perforation with the risk of intestinal perforation, hemorrhage, failure, infection, and risks to future fertility. No increased risk of infertility, miscarriages, or ectopic pregnancy has been demonstrated in women who have undergone abortion.

It is recommended that the practitioner discuss contraception options with the patient immediately following an abortion. The immediate insertion of an intrauterine device can be done safely. Various emotions may be experienced following an abortion. In most cases, women feel relief, but in others, feelings such as regret or sadness may arise.

=== Medication and psychology ===
In France, the healthcare system is accustomed to receiving women seeking abortion anonymously. However, in December 2009, the French Ministry of Health published a report by the Directorate for Research, Studies, Evaluation, and Statistics (DREES), stating that psychological support for women requesting an abortion is too often neglected.

=== Clandestine abortions ===
Typically performed under poor sanitary conditions, clandestine abortions are a cause of severe complications and high female mortality in many countries.

In 2003, 48% of abortions worldwide were performed under unsafe conditions, and over 97% of these unsafe abortions occurred in developing countries. A comprehensive study shows that between 2010 and 2014, 87.5% of abortions in developed countries were safe, compared to only 50.5% in developing countries. The rate of unsafe abortions rises to 76.4% in Latin America and 75.6% in Africa.

Approximately 20 million abortions are performed annually outside appropriate facilities or by practitioners lacking the necessary skills, or self-administered by women. An estimated 68,000 women die each year from these procedures, often due to hemorrhage, sepsis, or poisoning, with millions more suffering long-term consequences, sometimes including secondary infertility.

In 2020, the World Health Organization emphasized in its framework for preventing unsafe abortions:

Virtually all deaths and disabilities from abortions could be prevented through sexual education, the use of effective contraception, access to legal and medically safe induced abortion, and timely care for complications.

== Specific motivations ==
=== Sex-selective abortion ===
In several countries (India, China, Nepal, Vietnam, South Korea, Taiwan, etc.), where abortion has been legal since the 1970s, it is sometimes misused to select the sex of children. Cultural preferences in these countries favor male births due to issues of honor, family heritage, or religious practices. Despite prohibitions in these countries against using abortion for sex selection (e.g., in South Korea, until 2009, gynecologists were barred from revealing the baby's sex), millions of female fetuses are terminated annually. This has led to a surplus of male births in Asia for over two decades, resulting in a significant shortage of women. Asia is the only continent to have become predominantly male, leaving millions of men unable to find partners.

=== Trafficking of abortion products ===
In April 2005, The Observer reported an illegal trafficking of fetuses, including those over 12 weeks, from Ukraine to Russia, where their cells are used in beauty salons for illegal, scientifically dubious, and dangerous cosmetic treatments aimed at wealthy clients seeking rejuvenation. The newspaper alleges that traffickers pay Ukrainian women £100 to consent to abortions and allow the use of their fetuses by public research institutes. However, according to Ukrainian police, these institutes, plagued by corruption, resell the fetuses for £5,000 to private clinics, particularly in Moscow, where these treatments are performed. Some doctors reportedly pay women or deceive them into delaying their abortions, as later-term fetuses are particularly valued. According to the Russian Ministry of Health, 37 out of 41 Moscow clinics offering stem cell treatments were operating illegally.

== Ethical debate ==
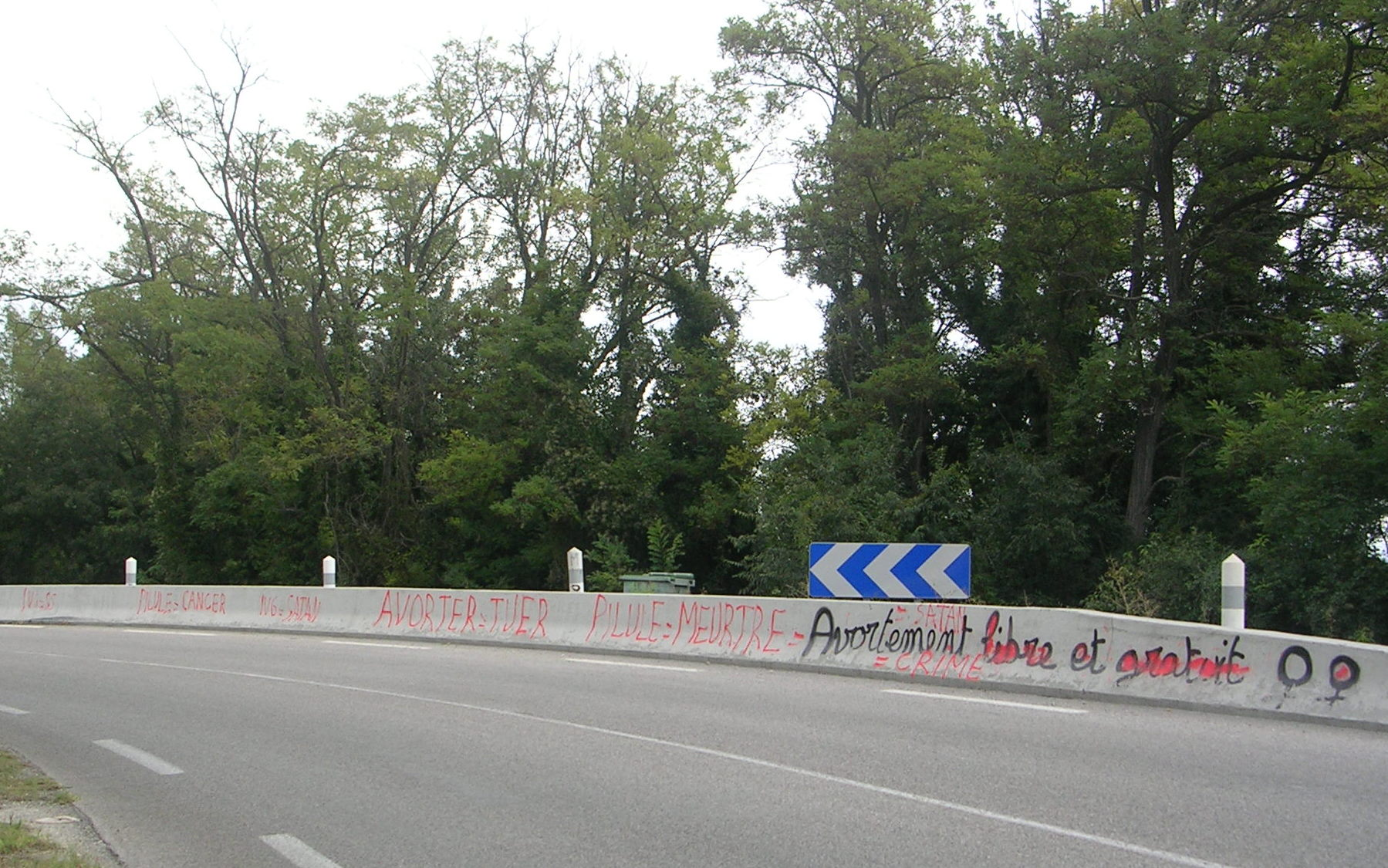
Slogans written along a country road (2010, France).

Abortion, beyond being a physiological phenomenon concerning pregnant women, is a social issue. The struggle for abortion rights is a significant part of the feminist movement, advocating for a woman's right to bodily autonomy, against the inalienability of the human body and the right to life of the embryo.

In countries where abortion is not legalized, mobilizations occur to secure this right. In countries where abortion is legal, particularly in the United States, Italy, and Spain, the right to abortion is sometimes contested by pro-life movements, which are often inspired by religion or conservatism.

However, opponents of abortion, whether based on religious or non-religious grounds, argue that it is primarily an ethical issue concerning the defense of the dignity of the person from the moment of conception. This raises significant philosophical debates about the status of the human person and when such status applies—whether at conception, the development of an embryo, or birth. In French law and Canadian law, only a born child has the legal status of a person. However, certain philosophical, metaphysical, or theological perspectives trace the existence of a being to before birth. In contemporary discourse, these perspectives often emphasize that, from conception, the embryo possesses the complete genetic information of an adult person.

Abortion is a subject of debate in most modern societies. It was traditionally prohibited for various reasons:

- Preservation of family rituals: In many societies, children care for the spirits of their ancestors after death, particularly in Chinese tradition, where abortion was never illegal but was a family or social decision in which the woman had no say and merely endured.
- Demographic concerns: Governments believed that allowing abortion reduced birth rates, and population size was a measure of power.
- Religious reasons: Most major religious traditions prohibit abortion, considering it an attack on human life.
- Gender inequality: Men often had primacy in deciding whether to have a child, denying women the right to choose abortion.

Social changes—such as the declining influence of religion and the sanctification of procreation, the reduced importance of population size relative to well-being, medical advancements, earlier sexual activity among youth in Western countries and later in others, poor information on contraception, weakening traditions, and gender equality—have gradually reduced prohibitions and led to broader legalization (expanded conditions, extended legal periods, etc.).

The challenge for legislators is to balance competing positions to set a legal abortion limit, which inevitably dissatisfies some groups. With both sides invoking non-negotiable values (the dignity of life versus personal freedom), abortion has been a persistent source of controversy for decades. Moreover, an ethical solution cannot ignore the profound dilemma posed by choosing one way or the other, given the intense social pressures surrounding the issue. Legally, the status of a person is tied to sufficient embryonic development (a variable limit), permitting abortion before this point and potentially penalizing it afterward. With varying and evolving legislation worldwide, no universal definition of what constitutes an embryo or a full person has been established, as science alone cannot provide an answer.

== Religions ==
=== Judaism ===
The Torah states: "There shall be no woman in your land who miscarries or is barren. I will fulfill the number of your days" (Exodus 23:26). However, certain provisions address fetal life directly or indirectly. The strictest prohibition relates to the ban on killing. This prohibition is explicit when the Halakha considers the fetus a living being, though Talmudic sources are neither unanimous nor clear on this (e.g., Rashi suggests that a fetus is not necessarily a human being). Other provisions, such as the general respect owed to human life (evident in the prohibition against harming or destroying human seed), also argue against abortion. Consequently, abortion is generally considered "against the law" and disapproved of. However, the Talmud holds that a fetus is not formed until after 41 days, so an abortion before this period is treated less severely.

Jewish law permits abortion if the fetus poses a direct threat to the pregnant woman's life. The boundaries of this threat are widely debated. The Mishnah explicitly states that the fetus must be sacrificed to save the mother, as the mother's life takes precedence over that of an unborn child. Consequently, most rabbinic authorities allow abortion in cases of a life-threatening risk to the woman, while others extend this to risks of worsening physical or mental health conditions.

With the exception of Rabbi Eliezer Waldenberg, the vast majority of Jewish authorities do not recognize fetal abnormalities as grounds for abortion. Rabbi and posek Moshe Feinstein prohibited prenatal diagnoses leading to abortion requests, stating: "In recent years, there has been a growing number of abortions performed. It is forbidden for doctors who respect the Torah to participate in an abortion in any way, whether the patient is Jewish or not. The prohibition of abortion is a universal prohibition and applies equally to non-Jews and Jews." However, Rabbi and posek Shaul Israeli permits abortion in certain cases of fetal illness, considering it part of the Mitzvah to love one's neighbor.

=== Buddhism ===
The Buddhist tradition marks the start of human life, bhava, at the first signs of consciousness: the ability to feel pleasure or pain and react to it. This is when a being inherits past karma. According to Ajahn Brahm, this can be associated with the emergence of the nervous system, the capacity to feel suffering, and the manifestation of will; an embryo outside the maternal womb (e.g., for research or in vitro fertilization) "is not recognized as human life, and thus ethical considerations specific to humans do not apply".

Buddhism prohibits abortion when it ends a life, as the first precept of Buddhist ethics is not to kill (an act of killing is constituted when there is intent to kill, effort to kill, and the death of the victim). According to the monastic code of Theravada Buddhism, the Vinaya, a monk who recommends or facilitates an abortion commits a grave offense (parajika) and faces immediate expulsion from the Sangha. In Tibetan Buddhism, the Dalai Lama acknowledges situations that justify abortion (medical termination of pregnancy). The precise delineation of these situations is generally recognized as a social issue beyond the scope of Buddhist philosophy. From a moral perspective, only compassion, Karuna, can justify such an action.

=== Christianity ===
==== Catholicism ====
The Catholic Church reaffirms its condemnation of direct abortion in the encyclical Evangelium Vitae. According to Pope John Paul II, "The one who is eliminated is a human being at the very beginning of life, the most innocent being imaginable: it could never be considered an aggressor, let alone an unjust aggressor! It is weak, defenseless, to the point of being deprived even of the smallest means of defense, that of the imploring cries and tears of a newborn." The Church has not formally pronounced on the exact moment of ensoulment but, per Donum Vitae, calls for respect for life from conception.

In magisterial texts and the Catechism of the Catholic Church, direct abortion is considered, if performed with full knowledge and consent, an extremely grave sin: it falls under the category of mortal sins, which destroy charity in the human heart. According to canon law, it incurs an automatic (latae sententiae) excommunication for anyone over 16 who is fully aware of the act, including the woman undergoing the procedure and the medical or paramedical staff involved. However, indirect abortion, where the fetus's death is an unintended consequence of treatment provided to the mother, is not condemned.

However, some individuals and groups claiming to be Catholic contest the Magisterium's teaching on abortion (and other issues), as evidenced by the 1984 document "A Catholic Statement on Pluralism and Abortion" published in The New York Times and signed by numerous American theologians. The association Catholics for Choice, primarily active in the United States, argues that abortion can be a morally acceptable choice in certain cases; however, the episcopal conferences of the United States and Canada state that it cannot claim to represent Catholicism. The Christian feminist collective L'autre Parole, many of whose members are of Catholic tradition, identifies as "pro-life and pro-choice".

==== Orthodox Church ====
The Orthodox Church's moral stance aligns with that of Catholicism, but under the principle of preserving life, it may permit abortion if a bishop or priest discerns that continuing the pregnancy would lead to the death of both the unborn child and mother.

==== Evangelical Christianity ====
The majority of evangelical Christian churches oppose abortion and support recourse to adoption agencies and social support agencies for mothers who wish to keep their babies.

=== Islam ===
The Quran does not directly address abortion, so interpretations rely on scholarly opinions.

The Sahih al-Bukhari (book of hadiths) indicates that the soul is infused into the fetus after 120 days of gestation. Consequently, some Hanafi scholars permit abortion before the end of this 120-day period, though others teach that abortion within this period is makruh (disapproved, i.e., discouraged). The Maliki school holds that "the fetus is endowed with a soul from conception". Thus, "most Malikis do not permit abortion at any point, considering that the hand of God actively forms the fetus at every stage of its development." However, all Islamic schools of thought agree on the legality of abortion when the mother's life is in danger, as the mother's life takes precedence.

In Shia Islam, abortion is "prohibited after the implantation of the fertilized ovum". The leader of the Iranian Revolution, Ayatollah Khomeini, declared that Sharia prohibits abortion without reason "even at the earliest possible stage". This position is shared by other Shia scholars.

== Prevalence ==
As of 2009, the abortion rate was 17.4 abortions per 1,000 women aged 15–44, a slight increase over the 2002 rate of 16.9 abortions per 1,000 women aged 15–44.

=== Total number of abortions ===
Percentage of conceptions leading to abortion in France

The following tables cover metropolitan France only and do not include the Overseas departments of France (French Guiana, Guadeloupe, Martinique, Mayotte and Réunion).

Year	Abortions
1975	33,454
1976	134,173
1977	150,931
1978	150,417
1979	156,810
1980	171,218
1981	180,695
1982	181,122
1983	182,862
1984	180,789
1985	173,335
1986	166,797
1987	162,352
1988	166,540
1989	165,199
1990	201,171
1991	205,048
1992	197,554
1993	197,040
1994	191,879
1995	181,781
1996	189,760
1997	191,431
1998	198,875

Year	Abortions
1999	199,742
2000	198,700
2001	207,228
2002	211,898
2003	208,759
2004	210,664
2005	206,311
2006	215,390
2007	213,382
2008	208,242
2009	208,939
2010	211,985
2011	209,291
2012	207,120
2013	216,697
2014	211,764
2015	203,463
2016	197,777
2017	202,919
2018	209,522
2019	217,536
2020	207,497
2021	208,248
2022	218,441

== See also ==
- Abortion law (Veil Act)
- Abortion debate
- Abortion-rights movements
- Birth control in France
- Catholic Church and abortion
- Feminism in France
- March for Life (Paris)
