= Birth control in France =

Overview of contraceptives in France

There are many types of contraceptive methods available in France. All contraceptives are obtained by medical prescription after a visit to a family planning specialist, a gynecologist or a midwife. An exception to this is emergency contraception, which does not require a prescription and can be obtained directly in a pharmacy.

== History and important dates ==
In the context of a pro-natalist narrative after World War I, contraception and abortion were heavily reprimanded in France. A law from 1920 defined abortion as a crime, subject to prison or the death penalty. This law was applicable to both the person performing the abortion and the person having the abortion. This law also forbade the "propaganda of any birth control methods"

The Catholic church was heavily against any methods of contraception and with France being predominantly Christian, access to contraception took a long time to be accepted. In 1968, Pope Paul VI, took a position against any form of family planning and birth control. This marked a split for a lot of Christians at the time who believed there was too much interference from the Church in their private life and body autonomy. Furthermore, it highlighted the gap between the Church's official line and the reality of a need for better access to family planning.

The legalization of birth control occurred in France in 1967, when the Neuwirth Law lifted the ban on birth control methods on December 28, 1967, including oral contraception. It legalized the free prescription of the contraceptive pill.

In 1973, the Movement for the Freedom of Abortion and Contraception (MLAC) was created. From 1974 onwards, the pill has been reimbursed by the social security system in France.

In 1999, the morning-after pill (or emergency contraception pill) was available in pharmacies without prescription. Two years later in 2001, the Aubry law on abortion in France and contraception was adopted. The statutory period for abortion is fixed to 12 weeks and not only 10. Minors can be accompanied by an adult of their choice to obtain an abortion.

In 2022 France began to introduce free birth control to women between the ages of 18 and 25 years in order to reduce the number of unwanted pregnancies in the age group. The French government will provide access to birth control pills, intrauterine devices, contraceptive patches and injectable birth control.

In 2023 France announced free access to male condoms for people aged between 18 and 25 years old. Pharmacies will provide free packets of 6, 12 or 24 condoms. This measure is part of a broader plan from the French Ministry for Health to have access to better sexual health. Female condoms however are not free.

== Laws and policies ==
In France, a prescription is required to obtain hormonal birth control.

- December 2015 : The Health Act law by Marisol Tourraine introduced a 'no questions asked' policy regarding contraceptives and stated emergency contraceptives may be administered by school nurses.
- On Friday, October 26, 2012, the National Assembly adopted two amendments to the Social Security Financing Bill for 2013 almost unanimously. This bill extends free contraception to all minors aged 15 to 18. The goal of putting greater free access to contraception in place is to reduce the number of unwanted pregnancies, and thus the number of abortions, in France.
- French law on modernization of the health system: Young girls will unconditionally be able to obtain morning after pills in secondary school infirmaries without parental consent or notification.

== Different means of contraception in France ==
The pill is the most well-known and the most-used means of contraception in France. There are different pills. A visit to a gynecologist is required for a prescription and to see which type of pill is most suitable. While it is the most used means of contraception, in France, fewer women are using the pill. This is due to the debate related to the risks of 3rd and 4th generation pills, and also to the development of alternative and less restrictive means of birth control.

The contraceptive implant is a small stick put in place under the skin. The implant contains the same hormones as contraceptive pills. These hormones are diffused directly into the blood and suppress ovulation. The advantages are that it is easy to put in place, efficient and discreet. It is possible to keep the same implant for three years. In France, contraceptive implants have been available since 2001. The implant can be bought in pharmacies, costs €106.76 and is reimbursed up to 65% by Social Security. The implant, its insertion and removal are free for women under 18 years old in the planning centers of public hospitals.

The patch can be used for four consecutive weeks and should be applied on the stomach, the shoulders or the lower back. It should never be applied near a breast. A box of patches can be bought in pharmacies with a prescription, and costs around €15 but is not reimbursed by the Social Security.

Condoms are also used in France. There are two kinds of condoms: male and female. It is easy to find male condoms in France in pharmacies, convenience stores, café/tobacco shops, or vending machines.

Spermicides are substances in the form of gel or capsules inserted in the vagina, which inactivate or destroy the spermatozoa. In France, spermicides are available without prescription but they are not reimbursed by Social Security.

There are also intrauterine devices (IUD): There are copper IUDs or hormonal IUDs. The insertion of an IUD is done by a gynecologist or a midwife. The intrauterine Device (IUD) must first be prescribed by a doctor or midwife. The price depends on the type of IUD: for the copper IUD, it is around €30 and for the hormonal IUD, it costs €125,15. Both are reimbursed up to 65% by Social Security.

Injectable progestin is a synthetic progestin (medroxyprogesterone) injected intramuscularly every three months. It is effective for 12 weeks. Each dose costs €3,44 and it is reimbursed up to 65% by Social Security.

Diaphragms are generally made of latex or silicone. They slide into the vagina, in contact with the cervix, to prevent the passage of sperm to the inside of the uterus. They can be inserted in advance and are reusable.

The vaginal ring is a flexible porous plastic ring that contains a combination of estrogen and progestin. The advantage compared to the pill is that it does not need to be remembered daily. It costs €16 and is available in pharmacies with a prescription, but it is not reimbursed by Social Security.

Sterilization can be a female (tubal ligation) or a male sterilization (vasectomy). It is definitive. The intervention can be only operated after a reflection period of four months after the first consultation.

Natural methods are another means of contraception, without hormones: Ogino method, temperature method, Billings method, withdrawal. Natural methods are free but they can be imprecise and not always reliable.

There are also two kinds of emergency contraception. The morning after pill must be taken within 72 hours of unprotected sex and is available in pharmacies. The intrauterine device (IUD) may also be used as an emergency contraception up to five days after unprotected intercourse to prevent pregnancy.

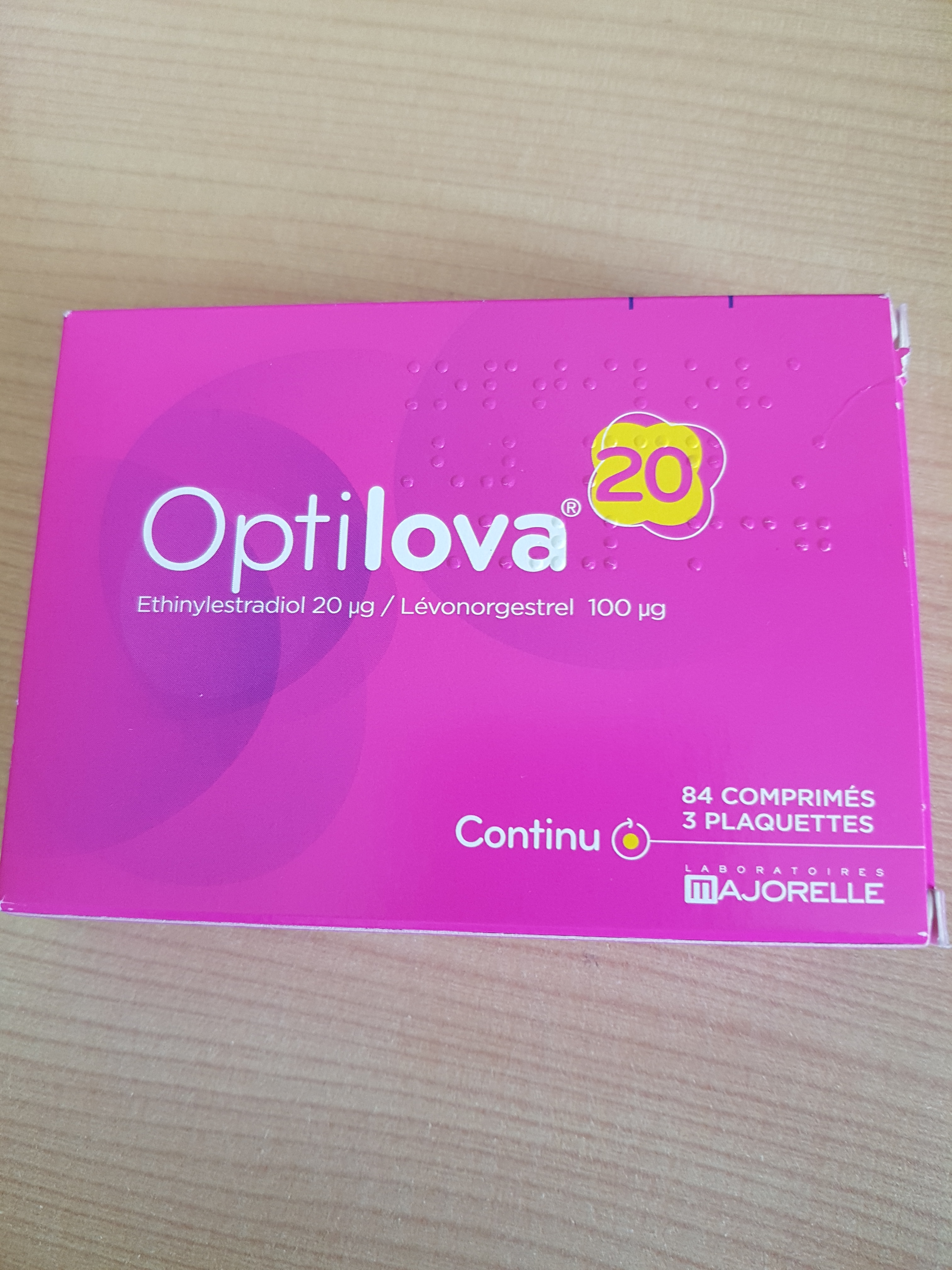
A brand of birth control Pills in France

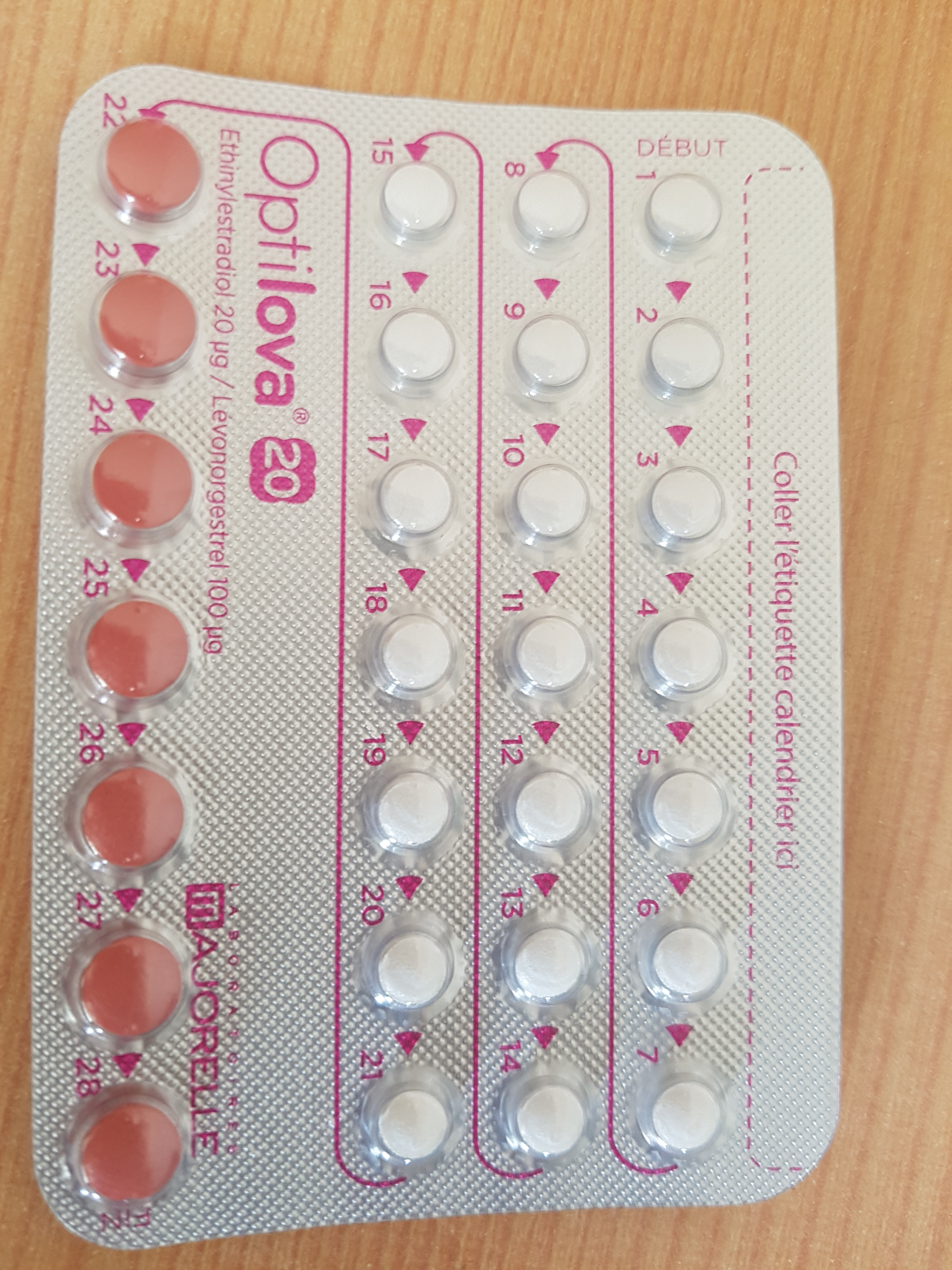
Plate of birth control pills

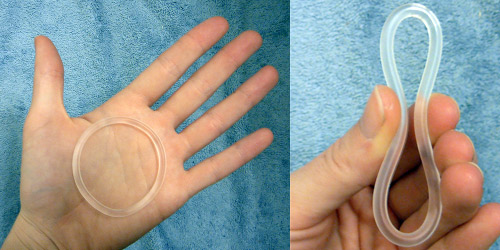
Vaginal Ring

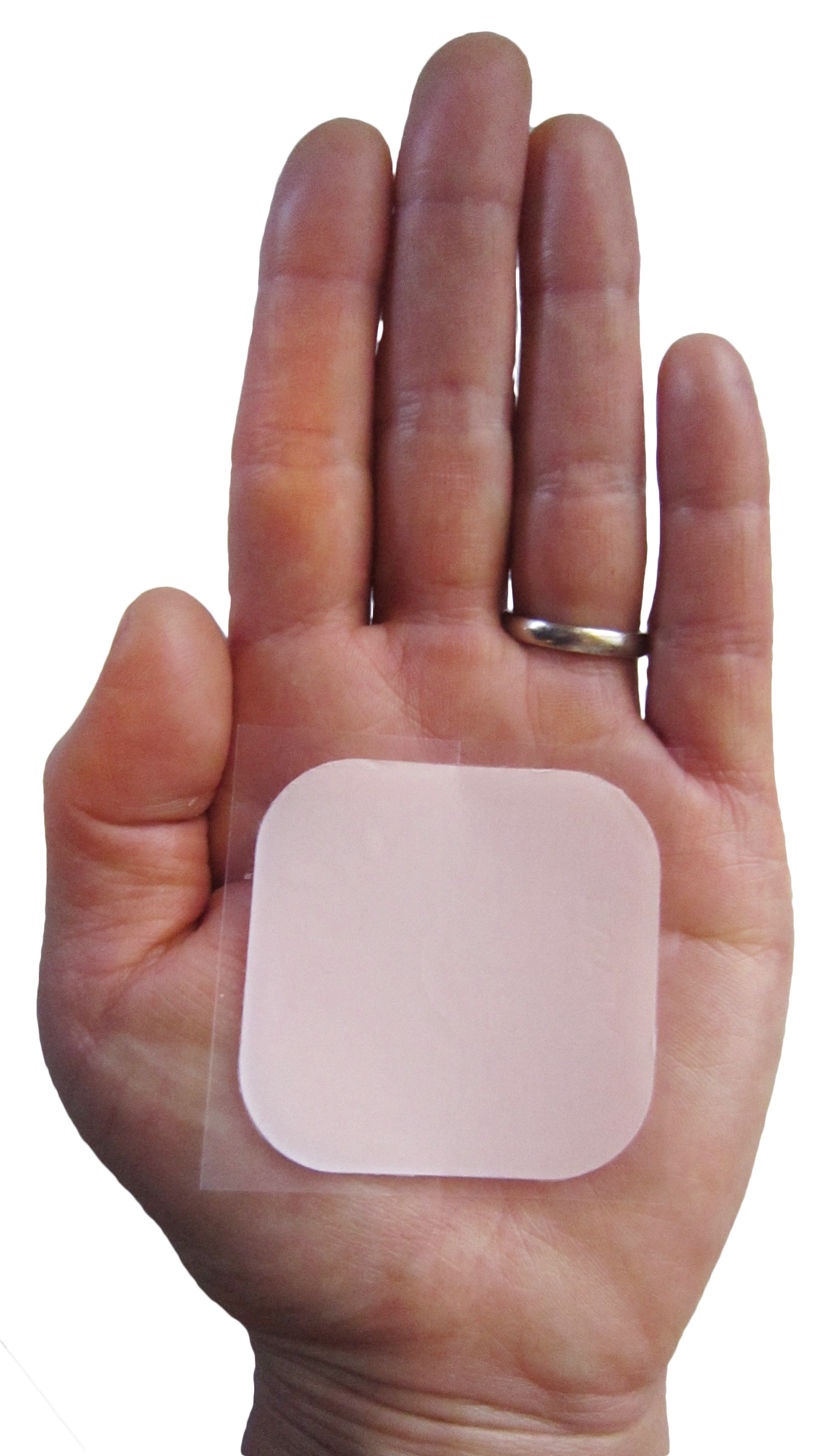
Patch

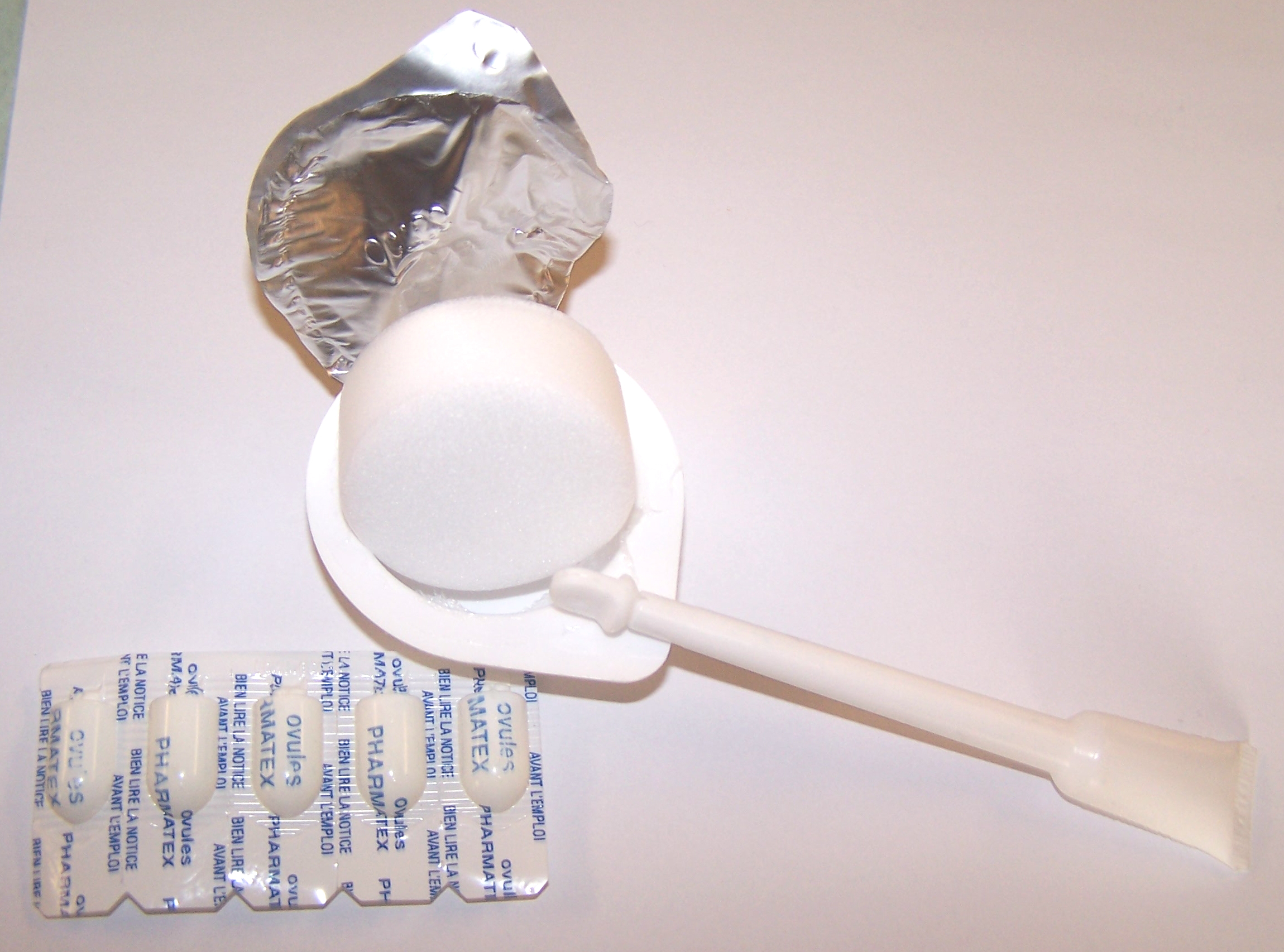
Cream and Eggs Spermicides

== See also ==
- Abortion in France
