= Catherine Claude =

French writer

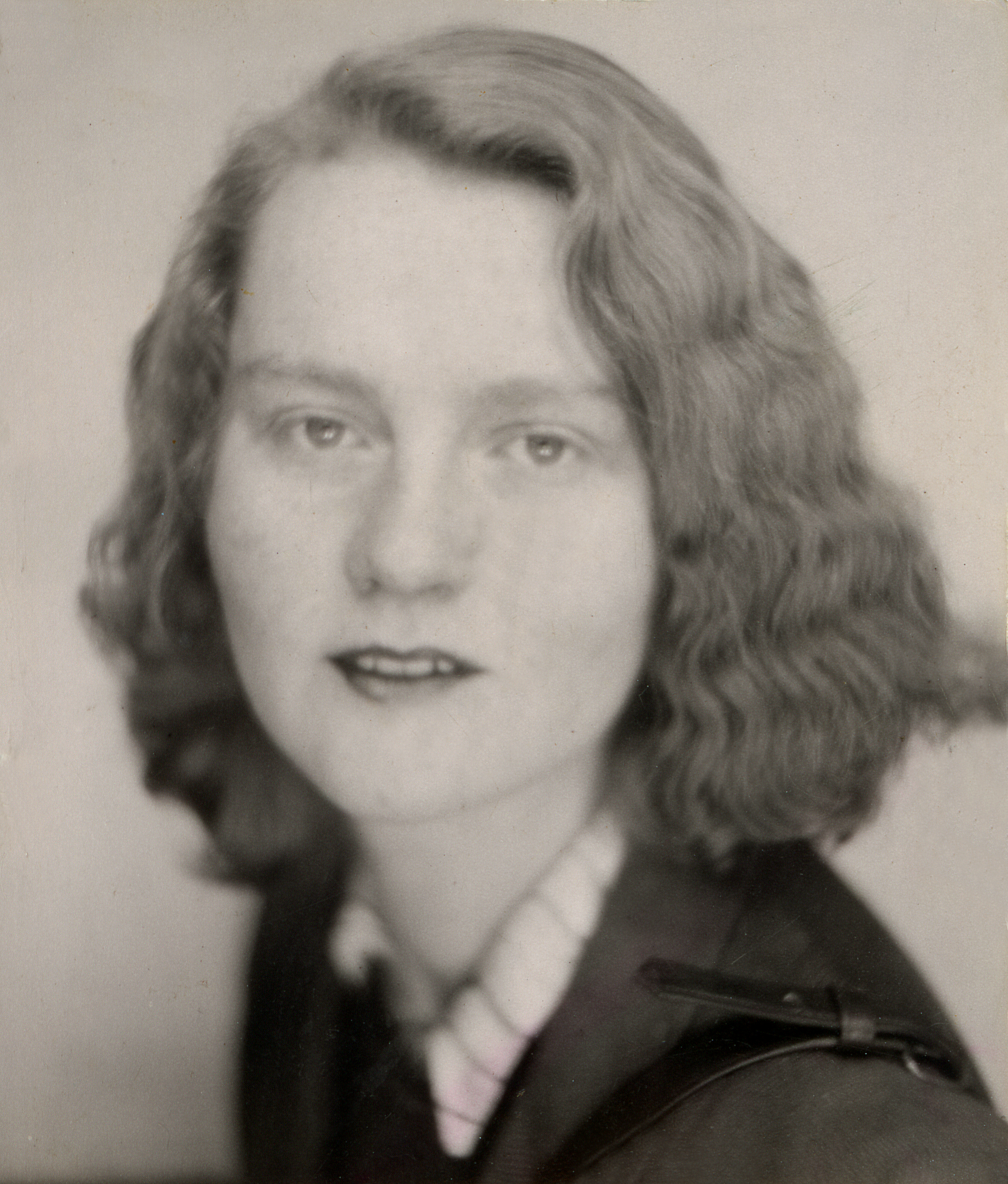
- Catherine Claude near the end of the Second World War
- Born: Jeanne Guillaud; 23 December 1924; Bourgoin, France
- Died: 23 August 2000 (aged 75); Paris, France
- Education: Lycée Stendhal
- Occupations: Novelist, essayist
- Children: 2
- Writing career
- Pen name: Catherine Piermont
- Language: French
- Literary movement: Communism, feminism

Catherine Claude (23 December 1924 — 23 August 2000), nom de plume of Catherine Piermont, née Jeanne Guillaud, was a French novelist, essayist, literary critic and former president of the Writers' Union of France.

== Biography ==
=== Youth ===
Jeanne Guillaud's parents met in the French Communist Party, and her childhood was shaped by her parents' continued engagement with the party. After the onset of the Spanish Civil War, her father joined the International Brigades in 1936, dying the following year at the Battle of Teruel. After the Republicans were defeated, a young Spanish refugee lived with Guillaud and her mother until World War II.

=== World War II ===
She studied at Lycée Stendhal in Grenoble. She was close to her French teacher, Colette Audry (1906-1990), who published several novels after the war and whose influence probably played a role in her vocation as a writer.

She joined the French Resistance in 1943 in the immigrant workforce (MOI), an organization of the Communist Party gathering immigrants, the most active in the Resistance in Grenoble in 1943. She fought under the authority of Charles Wolmark, who was arrested by the Gestapo and shot and killed in Charnècles. While in the Resistance, she met Claude Henriot, whom she later married.

She later took the pen name Catherine Claude, based on the false identities of her and her husband. Until May 1944, she was in charge of developing in the lycées of Grenoble another organization dependent on the Communist Party, the National Movement Against Racism. She was sent to Lyon in May 1944 and to Marseille, where she joined Claude.

=== Writer and militant feminist ===
She joined the Communist Party in January 1945. She participated at Ce soir, a newspaper created by the Communist Party in 1937, as a journalist in the foreign policy department.

She married Claude Henriot in 1945. The couple moved to Grenoble, where she worked as a journalist for the newspaper Le Travailleur alpin from September 1945 to June 1946. She was active in the Communist Party, particularly in the Union of French Women. She and Claude distanced themselves in 1956 after the repression of the Budapest uprising by the USSR and the publication of the Khrushchev Thaw.

She reapproached the Communist Party in 1968 and participated in the creation of the Union of Soviet Writers, by a group led notably by Jean-Pierre Faye, Nathalie Sarraute and Michel Butor.

She carried out several commitments by mixing writing, militant action and theoretical reflection around what remains like the great affairs of her life:

- the emancipation of women: La Querelle des femmes, Élever seul son enfant;
- social emancipation through the popular struggle: C'est la fête de l'Humanité;
- historical reflection: L'Enfance de l'humanité;
- ecology: Voyages et aventures en écologie.

She defined feminism as the search for authentic femininity more than a fight against men. About her book La Querelle des femmes, Christian Massé wrote: "From the Frankish woman to the red woman of May 1968, Catherine Claude describes a je-femme fighting for the parity of the two sexes" and, further: "Catherine Claude pronounces 333 times the word woman without ever condemning man." Lighter, Paris en zigzag, written with Colette Franc, is a walk in Paris over the course of history.

She signed the Manifesto of the 343 published in Le Nouvel Observateur on 5 April 1971, in which 343 women declared having an abortion, which was prohibited at the time. She collaborated with La Nouvelle Critique magazine during the 1960s and 1970s.

She moved away from the Communist Party in the late 1970s. She devoted herself to historical and linguistic research. L'Enfance de l'humanité is the product of this reflection. In the work, she studies the process by which hierarchical societies with hierarchical languages gradually dominated and eliminated peaceful, non-hierarchical societies.

== Selected works ==
=== Novels ===
- La Lune et le Soleil, 1959.
- Le Magot de Josepha, 1960.
- La Mort d'Armand, 1961.
- La Fête à Chaville, 1964.
- Ciel blanc, 1967. Prix littéraire de la Résistance, 1967.

=== Essays ===
- Un certain Bourvil, 1969. Rééditions, Messidor, 1990.
- Rabelais, 1972.
- Élever seul son enfant, 1975.
- La Querelle des femmes, 1995.
- C'est la fête de l'humanité, 1978.
- Voyage et Aventures en Écologie, 1976.
- Paris en zigzag, 1975. Co-written with Colette Franc.
- Elles, 1975.
- L'Enfance de l'humanité, 1997.
