= Lucien Neuwirth =

French politician

Member of the French Senate for Loire
- In office 1983–2001

Member of the National Assembly for Loire's 2nd constituency
- In office 1958–1981
- Succeeded by: Bruno Vennin

Personal details
- Born: Lucien Louis Neuwirth; 18 May 1924 Saint-Étienne, France
- Died: 26 November 2013 (aged 89) Paris, France
- Party: RPR
- Spouse(s): Marinette Didier Sophie Huet (m. 1999)
- Children: 1
- Education: Lycée Claude-Fauriel

Lucien Neuwirth (18 May 1924 – 26 November 2013) was a French politician first elected to the French National Assembly in 1958. The eponymous Neuwirth Law legalized birth control in France on 28 December 1967.

== Biography ==
Born in 1924, Neuwirth joined the French Resistance in 1940 and was arrested by the Vichy police. He later escaped through Spain. He was in London in 1944, where he discovered birth control which was then banned from France. He joined the Free French paratroopers and fought in Brittany, Belgium and the Netherlands, where he was wounded and taken prisoner in April 1945. He miraculously survived a firing squad, being only wounded by his captors.

After the war, Neuwirth joined the Rally of the French People and was elected to the Saint-Étienne city council. During his time in office he learned of the problems caused by unwanted births. As a member of the military reserve force, he spent some time in Algiers around 1958 and helped in the negotiations which led to the end of the French Fourth Republic.

He was elected to the French National Assembly in 1958. With some help from the French birth control movement (Mouvement français du planning familial), he wrote a law draft to legalize birth control in 1966. He faced a violent opposition in his political family, notably the government, and successfully pleaded his case to General De Gaulle himself. The Neuwirth Law was finally voted with left-wing support on 19 December 1967.

Neuwirth remained in the National Assembly until the pink wave of 1981 and was elected to the Senate in 1983. His main cause in his last years was palliative care, for which he supported two laws in 1995 and in 1999. He died in Paris on 26 November 2013 aged 89.
