= Philippe Langenieux-Villard =

French politician

- Born: May 20, 1955 (age 70); Paris, France
- Occupation: Politician

Philippe Langenieux-Villard (born 1955) is a French politician.

== Early life ==
Philippe Langenieux-Villard was born on May 20, 1955, in Paris, France.

== Career ==
He joined the Rally for the Republic. He served as a member of the National Assembly from 1993 to 1997, representing Isère. He became mayor of Allevard since 1989.

== Bibliography ==
- Aymeric Simon-Lorière (Paris: Cercle d'études et de recherches politiques, économiques et sociales, 1977, 84 pages).
- L’Information municipale (Paris: Presses universitaires de France, 1985, 127 pages).
- Lettre ouverte à ceux qui n'aiment pas la politique (Grenoble: Presses universitaires de Grenoble, 1988, 165 pages).
- Les Stations thermales en France (Paris: Presses universitaires de France, 1990, 125 pages).
- La Communication politique (with Sophie Huet, Paris: Presses universitaires de France, 1992, 207 pages).
- Allevard-les-Bains, mémoire commune : un maire rend hommage à ses prédécesseurs (prefaced by Emmanuel Le Roy Ladurie, Écully: éditions Horvath, 1992, 174 pages).
- L'Assemblée nationale (with Sylvie Mariage, coll. "Découvertes Gallimard" (nº 219), Paris: Editions Gallimard, 1994, 96 pages).
- L’Administration en questions : rapport au Premier ministre (Paris: La Documentation française, 1995, 103 pages).
- Place de la Résistance (Paris: Editions Alexandrines, 2005, 126 pages).
- Le Livreur (Paris: Editions Henri d'Ormesson, 2007, 138 pages).
- L’Affaire Rattaire (Paris: Editions Henri d'Ormesson, 2010).
- La Pomme d’Alan Turing (Paris: Editions Henri d'Ormesson, 2013).
- Les 100 mots des Alpes (with Jean Guibal, Paris: Presses Universitaires de France, 2014).
