= Manifesto of the 343 =

1971 French abortion rights petition

The Manifesto of the 343 Women (French: Manifeste des 343 Femmes) is a French petition penned by Simone de Beauvoir, and signed by 343 women, all publicly declaring that they had had an illegal abortion. The manifesto was published under the title, "Un appel de 343 femmes" ('An appeal by 343 women'), on 5 April 1971, in issue 334 of Le Nouvel Observateur, a social democratic French weekly magazine. The piece was the sole topic on the magazine cover. At the time, abortion was illegal in France, and by admitting publicly to having aborted, women exposed themselves to criminal prosecution.

The manifesto called for the legalization of abortion and free access to contraception. It paved the way for the "Veil Act" — named for Health Minister Simone Veil — which repealed the penalty for voluntarily terminating a pregnancy. The law was passed in December 1974 and January 1975, and afforded women the ability to abort during the first ten weeks (later extended to fourteen weeks).

== Background ==
Following the Liberation of Paris in 1944, the death penalty for abortion was abolished, but abortion continued to be prosecuted vigorously. Illegal abortion rates remained very high during the post-war period, and increasing numbers of women began to travel to the United Kingdom to procure abortions after the UK legalized abortion in 1967.

During the period of civil unrest during, and after, the events of May 1968, a new civil rights movement was becoming prominent throughout the media, campaigning for more equal rights and opportunities for women. The Mouvement de Libération des Femmes's ("The Women's Liberation Front") main goal was to advocate for women's right of autonomy from their husbands, as well as rights that pertained to the use of contraception and legalization of abortion.

== The text ==
The text of the manifesto was written by Simone de Beauvoir. It began (and translated into English):

Un million de femmes se font avorter chaque année en France. Elles le font dans des conditions dangereuses en raison de la clandestinité à laquelle elles sont condamnées, alors que cette opération, pratiquée sous contrôle médical, est des plus simples.

On fait le silence sur ces millions de femmes. Je déclare que je suis l'une d'elles. Je déclare avoir avorté.

De même que nous réclamons le libre accès aux moyens anticonceptionnels, nous réclamons l'avortement libre.
One million women in France have abortions every year. Condemned to secrecy, they do so in dangerous conditions, while under medical supervision, this is one of the simplest procedures.

Society is silencing these millions of women. I declare that I am one of them. I declare that I have had an abortion.

Just as we demand free access to contraception, we demand the freedom to have an abortion.

Simone Iff, then vice-president of the French section of Planned Parenthood (Le Mouvement français pour le Planning Familial), was integral to obtaining as many celebrity signatures as possible, although she herself did not sign the manifesto.

== Response ==
The week after the manifesto appeared, the front page of the satirical weekly Charlie Hebdo carried a drawing attacking male politicians with the question "Qui a engrossé les 343 salopes du manifeste sur l'avortement?" ("Who got the 343 sluts from the abortion manifesto pregnant?"). This drawing by Cabu gave the manifesto its familiar nickname, often mistaken as the original title. For Maud Gelly, doctor and author, "A caricature meant at ridiculing politicians left a macho insult to qualify these women, and that tells a lot about the anti-feminism sometimes dominating the rewriting of the history of women's struggles."

In 1971, the feminist group Choisir ("To Choose") was founded by Gisèle Halimi, to protect the women who had signed the manifesto. In 1972, Choisir formed itself into a clearly reformist body, and the campaign greatly influenced the passing of the law allowing contraception and legal abortion carried through by Simone Veil in 1974.

It was the inspiration for a February 3, 1973, manifesto by 331 French doctors declaring their support for abortion rights:

We want free access to abortion. It is entirely the woman's decision. We reject any law that forces her to defend herself, perpetuates an atmosphere of guilt against her, and allows dangerous underground abortions to persist ...

== Partial list of signatories ==
- Catherine Arditi
- Françoise Arnoul
- Brigitte Auber
- Stéphane Audran
- Colette Audry
- Tina Aumont
- Hélène de Beauvoir
- Simone de Beauvoir
- Loleh Bellon
- Catherine Claude
- Iris Clert
- Geneviève Cluny
- Lila De Nobili
- Lise Deharme
- Christine Delphy
- Catherine Deneuve
- Dominique Desanti
- Marguerite Duras
- Françoise d'Eaubonne
- Arlette Elkaïm-Sartre
- Françoise Fabian
- Annie Fargue
- Brigitte Fontaine
- Antoinette Fouque
- Claude Génia
- Gisèle Halimi
- Catherine Joly
- Olga Kosakiewicz
- Bernadette Lafont
- Danièle Lebrun
- Violette Leduc
- Marceline Loridan-Ivens
- Françoise Lugagne
- Judith Magre
- Geneviève Mnich
- Ariane Mnouchkine
- Claudine Monteil
- Jeanne Moreau
- Michèle Moretti
- Liane Mozère
- Bulle Ogier
- Marie Pillet (Julie Delpy's mother)
- Marie-France Pisier
- Micheline Presle
- Marthe Robert
- Christiane Rochefort
- Yvette Roudy
- Françoise Sagan
- Delphine Seyrig
- Alexandra Stewart
- Gaby Sylvia
- Nadine Trintignant
- Irène Tunc
- Agnès Varda
- Ursula Vian-Kübler
- Marina Vlady
- Anne Wiazemsky
- Monique Wittig
- Anne Zelensky

As of 2024, 19 signatories are still living.

== See also ==
- Manifesto of the 121 – 1960 open letter supporting Algerian independence from France
- fr:Mouvement pour la liberté de l'avortement et de la contraception (MLAC)
- We've had abortions! (1971)
- You Know Me movement (2019)
