= Sophie Huet =

French journalist (1953–2017)

- Born: Sophie Charlotte Huet; 20 January 1953; 8th arrondissement of Paris, France
- Died: 29 July 2017 (aged 64); Neuilly-sur-Seine, France
- Occupation: Journalist
- Employer: Le Figaro
- Spouse(s): François de Salvert Lucien Neuwirth (m. 1999)

Sophie Huet (20 January 1953 – 29 July 2017) was a French journalist. She was a political journalist for Le Figaro, and the first woman to serve as the president of the Association of Parliamentary Journalists.

== Early life ==
Sophie Huet was born on 20 January 1953 in Paris.

== Career ==
Huet began her career as a journalist for L'Aurore in 1976. She covered politics in 1977 and the French Parliament in 1978. She joined Le Figaro in 1980.

Huet served as the president of the Association of Parliamentary Journalists from 2006 to 2017. She was the first woman to serve in this capacity.

Huet was the author of three books, one of which she co-wrote with Philippe Langenieux-Villard. She became an officer of the Legion of Honour in 2010.

== Personal life and death ==
Huet was married twice. She first married François Montrognon de Salvert, followed by Lucien Neuwirth.

Huet died on 29 July 2017 at the age of 64.

== Works ==
- Huet, Sophie (1981). Tout ce que vous direz pourra être retenu contre vous : ou les petites phrases du septennat. Paris: J. Picollec. ISBN 9782864770206. OCLC 8628135.
- Huet, Sophie; Langenieux-Villard, Philippe (1982). La Communication politique. Paris: Presses universitaires de France. ISBN 9782130378730. OCLC 251608514.
- Huet, Sophie (1993). Quand ils faisaient la guerre. Paris: Plon. ISBN 9782259026130. OCLC 243770657.
