= Liane Mozère =

French sociologist (1939–2013)

Liane Mozère (4 January 1939 - 17 October 2013) was a Chinese-French sociologist and feminist.

== Life ==
Born in China, Liane Mozère was educated at an American school in Beijing. When she was 10, her family escaped Mao's China and settled in Paris. Mozère participated in the May 1968 events in France and joined the group associated with Gilles Deleuze and Félix Guattari around La Borde clinic. Her PhD was on creches. Late in her life she was appointed professor of sociology at Paul Verlaine University – Metz.

== Works ==
- Le Printemps des Crèches, 1992
- 'In early childhood: What's language about?', Educational Philosophy and Theory 39 (3): 291-299 (2007)
