= Le Travailleur alpin =

Le Travailleur alpin ("The Alpine Worker") was a communist newspaper in France. Le Travailleur alpin had appeared as the Côte-d'Or regional organ of the French Communist Party during the Second World War. It began to appear as an open daily newspaper published from Grenoble on August 23, 1944, the same day that U.S. forces entered Grenoble.

Louis Maisonnat was the editor of Le Travailleur alpin.

Le Travailleur alpin was closed down by the Communist Party in 1948, in order to save the pro-communist newspaper Allobroges instead. Some staff, who had worked for both newspapers, were able to retain their employments.

The Communist Party organized a Fête du Travailleur alpin press festival annually, a tradition initiated in 1929 and that continued after the end of the publication of the daily newspaper.
