= Veil Act =

1975 French law on abortion

French Parliament
- Long title: Law of 17 January 1975 on the voluntary termination of pregnancy
- Citation: Articles L2212-1
- Enacted by: Fifth Republic
- Signed by: Valéry Giscard d'Estaing
- Signed: January 17, 1975
- Commenced: January 19, 1975

Legislative history
- Introduced by: Simone Veil
- Passed: December 20, 1974
- Status: Current legislation

The Loi Veil, officially the "Law of 17 January 1975 on the voluntary termination of pregnancy" (French: loi du 17 janvier 1975 relative à l'interruption volontaire de grossesse), is a law pertaining to the decriminalization of abortion in France. It was prepared by Simone Veil, minister of health during the presidency of Valéry Giscard d'Estaing.

The law was promulgated on 17 January 1975, with a duration of five years. It was renewed without time limit by a law passed on 31 December 1979.

== Background ==
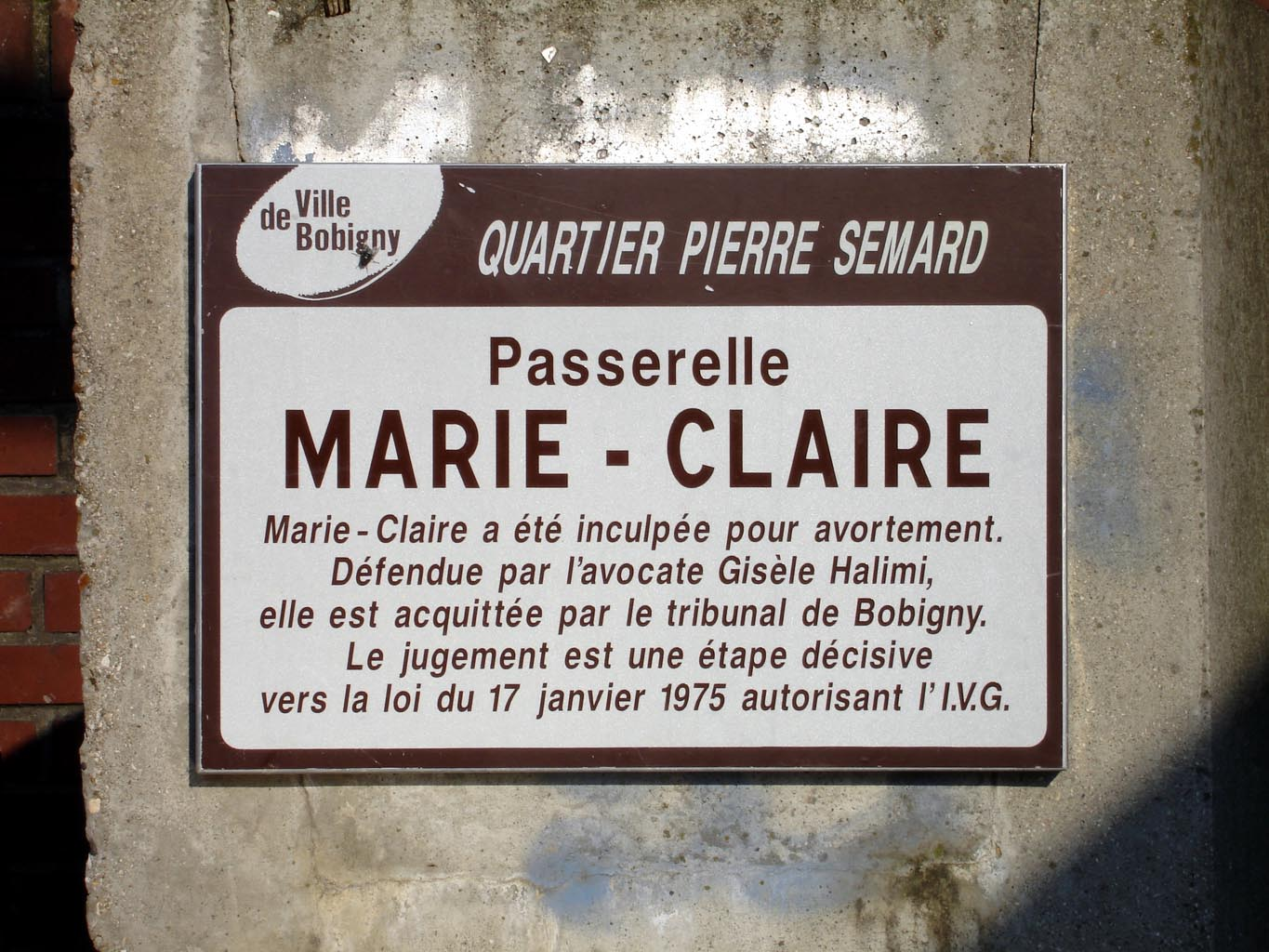
Sign identifying the Marie-Claire footbridge in Bobigny, recalling the importance of the Bobigny trial in the debates that led to the vote on the Loi Veil

The vote was preceded by various episodes related directly and indirectly to the ban on abortion, such as the legalization of contraception (1967), the Manifesto of the 343 (1971), the Bobigny trial (1972), and the Manifesto of the 331 (1973). After the Bobigny trial, the minister of justice instructed the Ministère public to cease prosecuting abortion.

An early law decriminalizing abortion was tabled under the presidency of Georges Pompidou (1969–1974).

Valéry Giscard d'Estaing promised to decriminalize abortion during his presidential campaign in 1974. As Minister of Justice, it fell to Jean Lecanuet to defend the law in Parliament, but he refused on grounds of personal ethics. Therefore, Minister of Health Simone Veil was charged with preparing the law soon after the election. She brought the law before the National Assembly on 26 November 1974, declaring in her speech:

I say this with all my conviction: Abortion must remain the exception, the last recourse for situations without any other option. But how can abortion be allowed without losing its character as an exception, without giving the impression that it is encouraged by society?

I would like, first and foremost, to share with you a woman's conviction — and I apologize for doing so in front of this Assembly almost exclusively composed of men — no woman resorts to an abortion with joy in her heart. Simply listen to women.

It is always a tragedy, and it will always remain a tragedy.

This is why, when the law presented before you takes account of the existing situation, when it admits the possibility of an abortion, it is to control it, and, as much as possible, to dissuade the woman.

— Simone Veil, Speech before the National Assembly, 26 November 1974

The vote was the object of heated, sometimes vicious, debate. Jean Foyer, who led the opposition to the law, declared in his response:

Have no doubt: Capital is already impatient to invest in this industry of death, and it will not be long until we come to know these "abor-toirs" in France, these abattoirs where they pile up the corpses of little babies, slaughterhouses my colleagues have had the opportunity to visit abroad.

After some 25 hours of intense debate by 74 speakers, the law was finally adopted by the Assembly on 29 November 1974 at 3:40 am, by a vote of 284 in favour and 189 against, thanks to the near-unanimous support from the parties of the left and the centre, against the objection of the majority, but not the entirety, of the members on the right, led by Jean Foyer (UDR), and including Simone Veil's own party.

The law was promulgated on 17 January. It was initially in force for a five-year period, on an experimental basis. It was renewed without time limit by law n°79-1204 on 31 December 1979.

== Content ==
The Loi Veil decriminalized voluntary termination of pregnancy before the end of the tenth week of gestation, with certain conditions:

- situation of distress;
- pregnancy of equal to or less than 10 weeks (12 weeks of amenorrhea);
- intervention performed by a doctor in a hospital setting;
- mandatory information and reflection procedures: two medical consultations (with a delay for reflection between the two) in which the risks and alternatives are presented by the doctors, and a psycho-social consultation;
- consent confirmed in writing;
- doctors and other health care personnel covered by a conscience clause, such that no one is required to terminate a pregnancy if they hold ethical objections.

The law also legalized voluntary termination of pregnancy for therapeutic reasons, which could be practiced under certain conditions:

- serious danger to the health of the woman, or strong probability that the unborn child would suffer from a particularly serious condition recognized as incurable at the time of diagnosis, as attested by two doctors;
- no delay, and performable until the last day of the pregnancy;
- intervention performed by a doctor in a hospital setting;
- doctors and other health care personnel covered by a conscience clause, such that no one is required to terminate a pregnancy if they hold ethical objections.

== Sources ==
- Simone Veil, une loi au nom des femmes (2010), documentary by Valérie Manns and Richard Puech, broadcast 4 March 2010 on France 2. (watch online on DailyMotion)
