= Feminism or death =

1974 book by Françoise d'Eaubonne

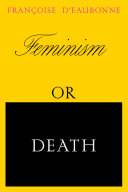
- Author: Françoise d'Eaubonne
- Translator: Ruth A. Hottell
- Publisher: P. Horay, Verso Books
- Publication date: 1974
- Publication place: France
- English publication date: 2022
- ISBN: 9781839764400
- OCLC: 610576047

Feminism or death (French: Le Féminisme ou la mort) is a book of essays about ecofeminism by Françoise d´Eaubonne. In it, d'Eaubonne first coined the term ecofeminism (l'eco-féminisme), which conceptualizes the apparent linkage between the treatment of women and the environment.

The book was published in 1974 by P. Horay, and an English translation by Ruth A. Hottell was released by Verso Books in 2022.

d´Eaubonne shows the commonality between the suppression of women and the suppression of nature.

== Background ==
D'Eaubonne's activism began early, with her involvement in the anti-Nazi resistance and later the Women's Liberation Movement. Though she was not a scholar, she was educated through her activism. After witnessing the advancement of feminism in the United States as well as France's involvement in the League of Women's Rights, she believed that the concept of feminism must be adapted to modern society.

D'Eaubonne stated that the ecological events that had occurred since 1974, the year she began writing, had illustrated the necessity of defining the linkage between environmental and feminist struggles, which she calls "the double problem". At the time, the environmental concerns from threats of nuclear war struck concern in d'Eaubonne. She also mentions emerging problems such as famine, pollution, and deforestation that were harming the environment on a global scale.

== Synopsis ==
D'Eaubonne begins by summarizing the treatment of women across the globe, utilizing "feminitude" to describe the universal tragedy of being a woman, who is discriminated against by male-dominated powers. She continues by defining two major threats of death: overpopulation and environmental destruction. She proceeds to explain how both of these threats are fueled by the suppression of women and their bodies as well as the exploitation of the environment by a patriarchal society.

After establishing this connection, d'Eaubonne calls feminists to action, ordering the integration of their cause with environmentalism to achieve a future of sustainability and equality. She believes this parallel exploitation is a matter of life or death, suggesting that it is beyond a matter of revolution, but of "mutation"—a dismantling of the systems of power themselves.

D'Eaubonne suggests solutions to overpopulation, such as increased access to contraceptives and abortion. However, the true solution to the problem, she claims, is the destruction of male power by women in favor of an egalitarian society. This, she says, is the "mutation" that will repair the world.

== Criticism ==
Within Feminism or Death, d'Eaubonne compares the discrimination of women to other marginalized groups, including homosexuals, Jews, and Black men. Critics have argued that the inclusion of this comparison is a dramatic simplification that does not reflect the extent of the oppressive system in modern-day society.

Feminism or Death has also been criticized for its lack of intersectionality and narrow-minded perception of women and the environment. Critics claim this diminishes the ideas expressed in the piece since they cannot be universally applied.

== Bibliography ==
- Le féminisme ou la mort, P. Horay, Paris, 1974. ISBN 9782705800178
  - Feminism or death, Verso, London, 2022. ISBN 9781839764400
