= Referendums in France =

The constitution of the French Fifth Republic allows three types of referendum:

1. At the national level, a legislative referendum on the initiative of President of the French Republic on a proposal by the Cabinet or the Parliament (since 1958 );
2. Locally, a local referendum initiative (since 2003).
3. The Constitutional Law of 23 July 2008 provides a shared initiative referendum (organized on the initiative of one-fifth of the members of Parliament, supported by one-tenth of registered voters).

== Concept ==
The referendum is a process used to reclaim democratic ideals, in which "the body of citizens are called to express, through a referendum, an opinion or intention with respect to any measure that other authority has taken or plans to take" (translated), (Note: Defined by Julien Laferrière 1947; Original text: le corps des citoyens est appelé à exprimer, par une votation populaire, son avis ou sa volonté à l'égard d'une mesure qu'une autre autorité a prise ou envisage de prendre..) which will be acted upon or adopted in case of positive response. The referendum allows only two possible responses: yes (adopt) or no (reject).

Terminologically, the word "referendum" rarely appears in the French constitutions before 1958. It was replaced by circumlocutions such as "consultation" or "appeal to the people." Only Article 3 of the Constitution of 27 October 1946 recognized the people's right to a referendum. In the 20th century, it seems necessary to distinguish between referendum, which implies a decision, with the discussion that results in an opinion. In legal literature the informal terms "référendum consultatif" (advisory referendum) and "consultation référendaire" (referendum), depending on whether one focuses on the action or the consequences of the action. All of these uses meet the generic definition given above. However, the jurisprudence of the State Council clearly distinguishes national referendums in which the French people exercise their sovereignty (Articles 11, 89 and 88-5), subject only to the Constitutional Council, and other referendums. (Note: CE Ass. Oct 30, 1998, Mr. Sarran, Mr. Levacher -. Note that section 88-5 is the result of a constitutional amendment in 2005, which came after the decision of the State Council)

The technique of a referendum is consistent with the democratic principle to which the republican regime established by the 1958 Constitution has claim:

- Art. 2 al. 5. - "(The) principle (of the Republic) is: government of the people, by the people and for the people"

The use of referendums at the national level tempers national sovereignty under the constitution, thus mixing the processes of direct democracy and representative democracy:

- Art. 3 al. 1. - "The national sovereignty belongs to the people who exercise it through their representatives and by means of a referendum ..."

However, the ways of implementing the various referendums and discussions provided for in the current constitution France as in many countries, are a method of semi-direct democracy.

== History of referendums in France ==
=== Impasse of the revolutionary opportunity ===
The referendum was an important part of constitutional thought during the revolutionary era. The draft constitution of the Girondists already provided for popular override of parliamentary acts. However, this concept did not make it to the final draft.

A referendum was first used in France in 1793 for the adoption of the Jacobin Constitution. This constitution, inspired by the writings of Jean-Jacques Rousseau, also planned to use a referendum for the adoption of laws which needed to obtain the approval of the people.

When the people met in assembly, if one-tenth of them in at least half of the departments (plus one), objected to the proposed law (see Articles 58-60), it was repealed. There was even talk of "popular veto". In constitutional matters, the electorate also had a right of initiative if one tenth of the primary assemblies decided to review the national level. The Constitution itself was adopted by referendum from July to August 1793, although some have reservations about the democratic nature of the latter. (Note: The vote was acquired freehand in each primary without accurate count, and there was a huge abstention.) This constitution was never applied.

=== The impact of plebiscitary use under the Empire ===
Because of that, we will be wary of populism: the ideas of Emmanuel Joseph Sieyès in favor of national sovereignty and representative democracy prevailed over popular sovereignty. However, Napoleon knew all too well how to take a direct appeal to the people, while domesticating them, and the long period that followed discredited the process.

Under the imperial regimes, referendums became a plebiscites, (Note: Instead of being called to electoral assemblies, citizens were invited to sign, during a fortnight, registers of open acceptance in each commune.) an aid in giving power to Bonaparte who, assisted by a zealous and pervasive administration, in 1800 obtained the Consulate after the coup of 18 Brumaire and the Consulate for life, and his transformation during the Empire, it gets extended, even if in moderated form at hundred Days. While similarly for Napoleon III who endorsed the coup of 1851, and the restoration of the Empire where clear constitutionalized plebiscitary techniques, (Note: Article 5 of the Constitution of 14 January 1852 states: "The President of the Republic is responsible to the French people, whom he still has the right to appeal." (Translated from Président de la République est responsable devant le Peuple français, auquel il a toujours le droit de faire appel.) before ratifying a highly liberalized government on the eve of the war of 1870.

In the Third Republic, the referendum became an instrument of despotism. As a result, the formation of the Fourth Republic ignored or marginalized the hypothetical use of referendum to only constitutional matters and alternatives. (Note: only if a two-thirds majority votes "No" for revision (Article 90). However, the first draft released in April 1946, provided for a referendum ratification of law (Article 123))

The trauma of the imperial practice was still alive and doctrinal debate was not yet extinguished. If lawyer Edouard Laboulaye defended the referendum in isolation at the time of establishment of the Third Republic, the entire doctrine, considered to be inconsistent with the parliamentary system until Carré de Malberg, who brilliantly supported an inverse position in 1931. But the majority of the political class remained suspicious until the end.

=== The footprint of General de Gaulle ===
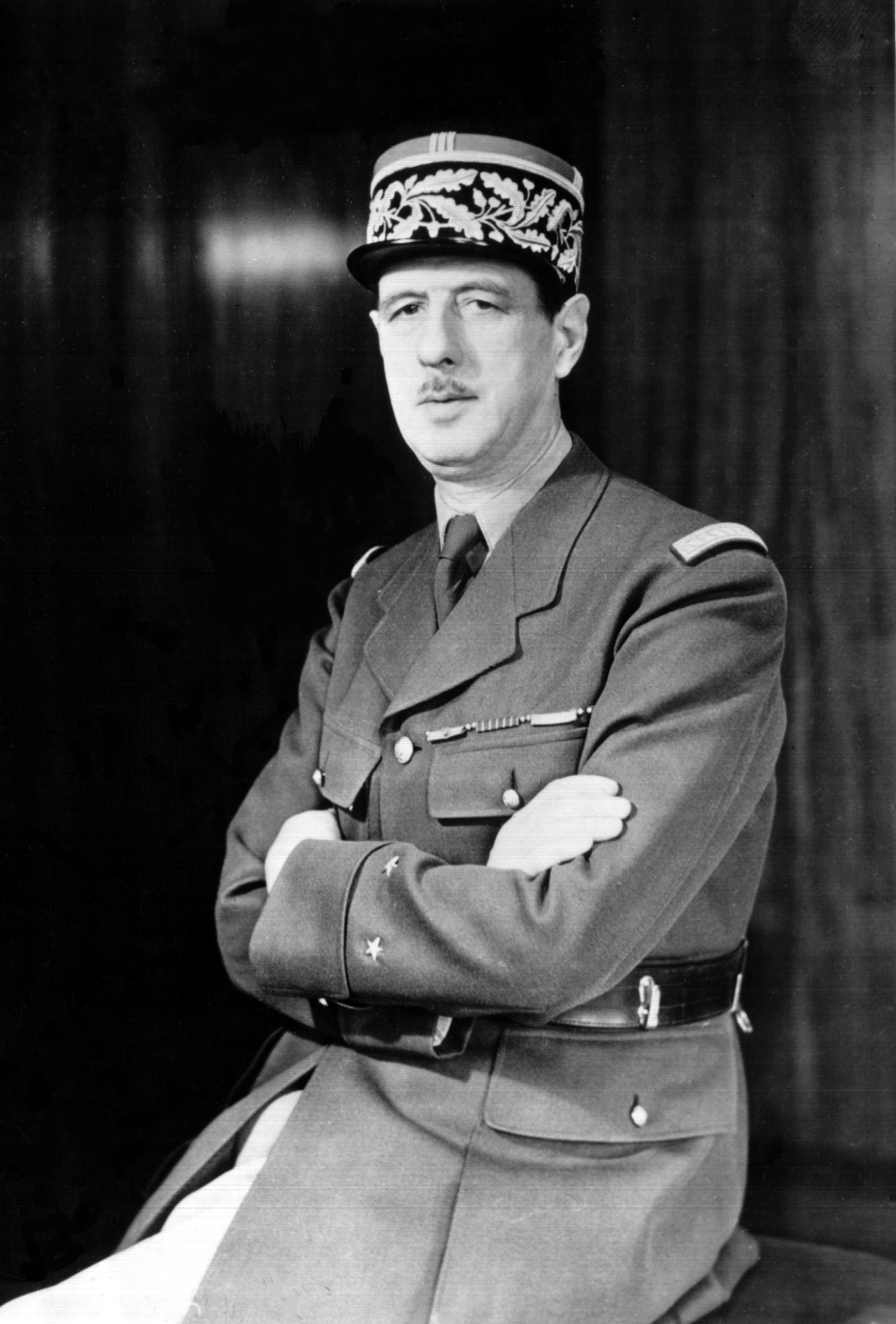
General de Gaulle used the referendum in 1945 at the Liberation and made his mark on the Fifth Republic

However, General Charles de Gaulle reintroduced the use of referendum from the liberation of France in 1945 to end the Third Republic, and give the country a provisional plan. In addition, twice in 1946 the French voted on the draft constitution which gave birth to the Fourth Republic. This allowed the people to free themselves from the past by voting "no" the first time. But the referendum was not implemented (Note: In proposals for a new government his Bayeux speech of June 16, 1946, de Gaulle does not mention the role of the referendum, whose use seems to be still be limited to the adoption of a new democratic constitution.) and it would not be until General de Gaulle's return to power in 1958 that the referendum was restored, both to ratify the new constitution and in the constitution itself which is one of its major innovations. Indeed, in the constitution of the Fifth Republic, referendum is embedded as a principle, as a means of exercising sovereignty (Article 3) and, simultaneously, covering three areas: legislative (Article 11), constituents (Article 89) and self-determination (Articles 53 and 86).

At the same time it focused criticism from opponents of the Fifth Republic, who saw it as a confirmation of the creation of an authoritarian government. In this instance, the referendum was in a much more democratic context than under the Empire, where the practice was strongly tinged with the plebiscite that de Gaulle would nevertheless regulate. Even so, many still had strong reservations about the referendum. Besides the use, by some considered unconstitutional, of Article 11 in 1962 and 1969 (see below), which raised strong debate and the establishment of a "cartel of no"; by the President of the Senate even speaking of "forfeiture." We also know that de Gaulle considering the referendum as a substitute for the dissolution to arbitrate any disagreement with Parliament, as a means to rejuvenate his personal legitimacy. (Note: For example: during the events of May 1968, de Gaulle announced first on May 24 he would hold a referendum before changing his mind five days later declaring the dissolution of the National Assembly)

It is therefore not surprising that the following referendums suggest that in France, the process is marked by a plebiscite. The impression that voters are motivated a contrario even if, unlike de Gaulle, none of his successors has openly raised the question of trust. This is the main reason for the use of referendums in recent years, where politically random referendums give an opportunity for the protest vote to speak, at the risk of failure (as was nearly the case in 1992, as was the case in 2005). In addition, out of an almost cultural dimension, the referendum may trigger a minor increase in interest and low participation which, because of the requirement for a quorum, reduces the scope of its result (as in 1972 and especially in 1988).

=== Outlook and balance in the 21st century ===
Notwithstanding the criticism that the terms of implementation of the referendum are subjective and despite its shortcomings (see below), the referendum still has its followers at the expense of only being used to renovate.

President Valéry Giscard d'Estaing did not have much recourse to a referendum that he wanted to use to fix some societal problems.

President François Mitterrand, who used the referendum after a hiatus of 15 years, failed in his attempt to broaden the scope of the referendum. The bill to expand the scope of Article 11 to include civil liberties was adopted by the National Assembly but was rejected by the Senate in 1984. Although Mitterrand had initiated the work of the Vedel Commission in 1993, after the mixed success of the 1992 referendum he did not act on the commission's proposals. On September 10, 1991, President Mitterrand announced a referendum in order to effect institutional reform affecting the presidential office, justice and the role of Parliament. This referendum was never held.

President Chirac succeeded somewhat in 1995 in expanding the scope of Article 11. Before becoming a victim to referendum in 2005, he had also announced his intention to reestablish the use of referendums. He followed through on this twice, the first of which was a constitutional matter, according to the procedure (Art. 89 para. 2), in 2000. Under his tenure, after tidying up the constitution in 1995, including the referendum. In addition to expanding its scope, Article 11 was stripped of its reference to the defunct French Community. Article 86 has become obsolete for the same reason, and has been removed. Two other reforms expanding the referendum succeeded: one in 2003, which establishes the local referendum (including Article 72-1); the other, Article 88-5, in 2005 which forced the use of referendum to ratify any new concession to the European Union.

In October 2021, Jean Lassalle filed a proposal for constitutional revision at the National Assembly, introducing the Citizens' Initiative Referendum for constitutional matters. Citizens would be able to trigger a referendum for a proposal of constitutional revision without involving representatives, provided they manage to gather 700,000 signatures. One week before the first round of the 2022 presidential elections, Jean Lassalle made a commitment before a notary to give away all his possessions if he fails to organize a referendum, once elected, to decide on the establishment of the Citizens' Initiative Referendum for constitutional matters.

== Bibliography ==
- de Malberg, Carré (1931). Considérations théoriques sur la question de la combinaison du référendum avec le parlementarisme [Theoretical considerations on the issue of combining the referendum with parliamentaryism] (in French). RDP. Malberg1931.
