= Françoise d'Eaubonne =

French ecofeminist (1920–2005)

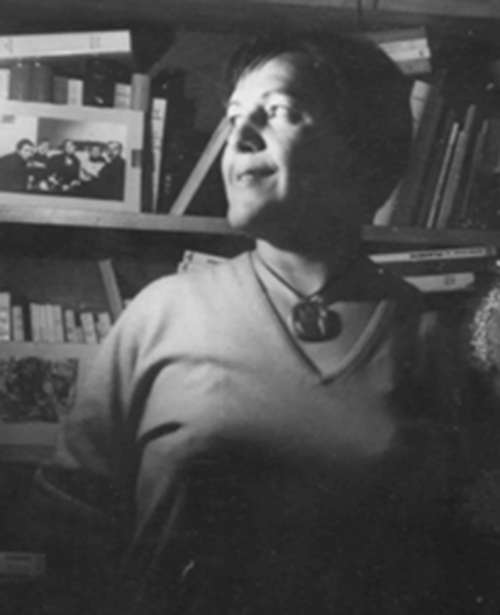
- D'Eaubonne in 1964
- Born: 12 March 1920; Paris, France
- Died: 3 August 2005 (aged 85); Paris, France
- Writing career
- Language: French
- Genre: Non-fiction
- Subject: Ecofeminism
- Notable work: Le Féminisme ou la mort

Françoise d'Eaubonne (French: [fʁɑ̃swaz d‿obɔn]; 12 March 1920 – 3 August 2005) was a French author, labour rights activist, environmentalist, and feminist. Her 1974 book, Le Féminisme ou la mort, introduced the term ecofeminism. She co-founded the Front homosexuel d'action révolutionnaire, a homosexual revolutionary alliance in Paris.

== Life and career ==
Her mother was a teacher, a child of a Carlist revolutionary. Her father was an anarcho-syndicalist and the secretary general of an insurance company. Both of her parents were members of the religious Sillon movement. When she was at the age of 16, the Spanish Civil War broke out. Later, she would express her feelings in this period of her life with the title Chienne de Jeunesse.

A member of the French Communist Party from 1945 to 1957, in 1971, she co-founded the Front homosexuel d'action révolutionnaire (FHAR), a homosexual revolutionary movement. Also that year, she signed the Manifesto of the 343 declaring she had an abortion. She is considered the founder of the ecological and social movement of ecofeminism. She created the Ecology-Feminism (Ecologie-Feminisme) Center in Paris in 1972. In 1974 she published her book Le Féminisme ou la mort (Feminism or Death) where she first coined the term ecofeminism. In the book, she speaks of a special connection women share with nature and encourages women's environmental activism. She cites toxic masculinity as the cause of population growth, pollution, and other destructive influences on the environment. Many scholars shared d'Eaubonne's view on women's inherent connection to nature. These scholars include Sherry Ortner, Rosemary Radford Ruether, Susan Griffin, and Carolyn Merchant.

Following her motto, "Not a day without a line", Françoise d'Eaubonne wrote more than 50 works, from Colonnes de l'âme (poetry, 1942) to L'Évangile de Véronique (essay, 2003). Her historical novel Comme un vol de gerfauts (1947) was translated into English as A Flight of Falcons, and extracts from her essay Feminism or Death appeared in the 1974 anthology New French Feminisms. She also wrote science fiction novels, like L'échiquier du temps and Rêve de feu, Le sous-marin de l'espace.

== Bibliography ==
- Novels:
  - Le cœur de Watteau, 1944
  - Comme un vol de gerfauts, prix des lecteurs 1947
  - Indomptable Murcie 1949
  - Belle Humeur ou la Véridique Histoire de Mandrin,1957
  - J'irai cracher sur vos tombes, 1959 (after the film I Spit on Your Grave)
  - Les Tricheurs, 1959 (after the film Les Tricheurs)
  - Jusqu'à la gauche, 1963
  - Les Bergères de l'Apocalypse, 1978
  - On vous appelait terroristes, 1979
  - Je ne suis pas née pour mourir, 1982
  - Terrorist's blues, 1987
  - Floralies du désert, 1995
- Biographies:
  - La vie passionnée d'Arthur Rimbaud, 1957
  - La vie passionnée de Verlaine, 1959
  - Une femme témoin de son siècle, Germaine de Staël, 1966
  - La couronne de sable, vie d'Isabelle Eberhardt, 1967
  - L'éventail de fer ou la vie de Qiu Jin, 1977
  - Moi, Kristine, reine de Suède, 1979
  - L'impératrice rouge : moi, Jiang King, veuve Mao, 1981
  - L'Amazone Sombre : vie d'Antoinette Lix, 1983
  - Louise Michel la Canaque, 1985
  - Une femme nommée Castor, 1986
  - Les scandaleuses, 1990
  - L'évangile de Véronique, 2000
- Essays:
  - Le complexe de Diane, érotisme ou féminisme, 1951
  - Y a-t-il encore des hommes?, 1964
  - Eros minoritaire, 1970
  - Le féminisme ou la mort, 1974
    - Feminism or death, 2022
  - Les femmes avant le patriarcat, 1976
  - Contre violence ou résistance à l'état, 1978
  - Histoire de l'art et lutte des sexes, 1978
  - Écologie, féminisme : révolution ou mutation ?, 1978
  - S comme Sectes, 1982
  - La femme russe, 1988
  - Féminin et philosophie : une allergie historique, 1997
  - La liseuse et la lyre, 1997
  - Le sexocide des sorcières, 1999
- Poems:
  - Colonnes de l'Ame, 1942 (Columns of the Soul)
  - Rutten, 1951
  - Neither place nor meter, 1981
