= Neuwirth Law =

The Neuwirth Law is a French law which lifted the ban on birth control methods on December 28, 1967, including oral contraception. It was passed by the National Assembly on December 19, 1967. The law is named after Lucien Neuwirth, the Gaullist politician who proposed it. It replaced a law from 1920 that not only forbade all forms of contraception, but also information about contraception. The law was not fully implemented until 1972 due to administrative delays.

== Background ==
Following the great losses of the First World War, all birth control means and their promotion had been banned in 1920 to ensure population growth. However, some French people could still get information and products from abroad. Several proposals had been made to unban birth control before 1966. In 1965, legalization of oral contraception was discussed by François Mitterrand during that year's presidential election, which shocked General Charles de Gaulle. Eleven bills were proposed between 1958 and 1967 and none of them made it onto the agenda.

== History ==
Lucien Neuwirth was a long-time opponent to the 1920 law, and faced opposition from the right to repeal it. He met with de Gaulle to provide reasoning for a new bill, and de Gaulle relented in letting one be drafted and considered. With some help from the French birth control movement (Mouvement français du planning familial), Neuwirth wrote a law draft to legalize birth control in May 1966.

Neuwirth created a special commission with other members Mitterrand and Marie-Claude Vaillant-Couturier. This commission brought in various institutions, associations, and scientists including Jacques Monod, François Jacob, Alfred Sauvy and Pierre Bourdieu. Neuwirth wrote a second bill representing the work of the commission and presented it to the new assembly on April 12, 1967. The assembly debates were sharp, but disciplined. The critics were mainly the conservatives who relayed the positions of Catholic organizations and the national doctor organization (l'Ordre des médecins). Debate concentrated around limits and freedom of prescriptions. Proponents for creating limits for contraceptive prescriptions noted the existing requirement on the practice of therapeutic abortion, where the opinion of three doctors was necessary.

Formally proposed during the spring of 1967, the Neuwirth Law, or the loi relative à la régulation des naissances et abrogeant les articles L. 648 et L. 649 du code de la santé publique, as approved by the joint committee, was passed with left-wing support on 19 December 1967. The law received support from all of the opposition party and part of the majority party. It was promulgated on 28 December under the name ′law relative to birth regulation′. Contraception and the contraceptive pill were authorized by the law but were not reimbursable by Social security.

== Afterwards ==
The relative executive decrees were blocked by the conservative government, notably Jean Foyer, then minister for Health, some as late as 1974. In the intervening years, oral contraceptives were on the market, but were routinely being prescribed for other purposes. In 1974, contraceptives became reimbursable under Social security.

Today in France, contraception is regulated in articles L5134, R5134 and R2311-13 of the public health code. Abortion was not affected by the Neuwirth Law, and was prohibited until the Veil Law of January 17, 1975, which provided for the decriminalization of conditional abortion.

Jointly with the Veil Law of 1974 which unbanned abortion, the Neuwirth law allowed couples to reduce the number of both wanted and unwanted births, leading to a decrease of the fertility from 2.5 to 1.81 children by woman in 1985.
