= Economy =

Production and trading of goods and services

Gross domestic product per capita of countries (2024, PPP): >$60,000; $50,000 – $60,000; $40,000 – $50,000; $30,000 – $40,000; $20,000 – $30,000; $10,000 – $20,000; $5,000 – $10,000; $2,500 – $5,000; $1,000 – $2,500; <$1,000; No data

An economy (Note: Sometimes spelled oeconomy or, with a ligature, œconomy in British English, both are pronounced /iːˈkɒnəmi/. The term is ultimately derived from Greek οἰκονομία, from οἶκος, "house", and νέμω, "to manage". In contemporary times, however, the spelling that begins with œ has become obsolete and rarely used, since it has been reduced to e in American English or separated as oe in British English. From the eighteenth century, the spelling oeconomy dropped the letter o, thus making economy the common spelling for the term.) is an area of the production, distribution and trade, as well as consumption of goods and services. In general, it is defined as a social domain that emphasize the practices, discourses, and material expressions associated with the production, use, and management of resources. A given economy is a set of processes that involves its culture, values, education, technological evolution, history, social organization, political structure, legal systems, and natural resources as main factors. These factors give context, content, and set the conditions and parameters in which an economy functions. In other words, the economic domain is a social domain of interrelated human practices and transactions that does not stand alone.

Economic agents can be individuals, businesses, organizations, or governments. Economic transactions occur when two groups or parties agree to the value or price of the transacted good or service, commonly expressed in a certain currency. However, monetary transactions only account for a small part of the economic domain.

Economic activity is spurred by production which uses natural resources, labor and capital. It has changed over time due to technology, innovation (new products, services, processes, expanding markets, diversification of markets, niche markets, increases revenue functions) and changes in industrial relations (most notably child labor being replaced in some parts of the world with universal access to education).

== Etymology ==
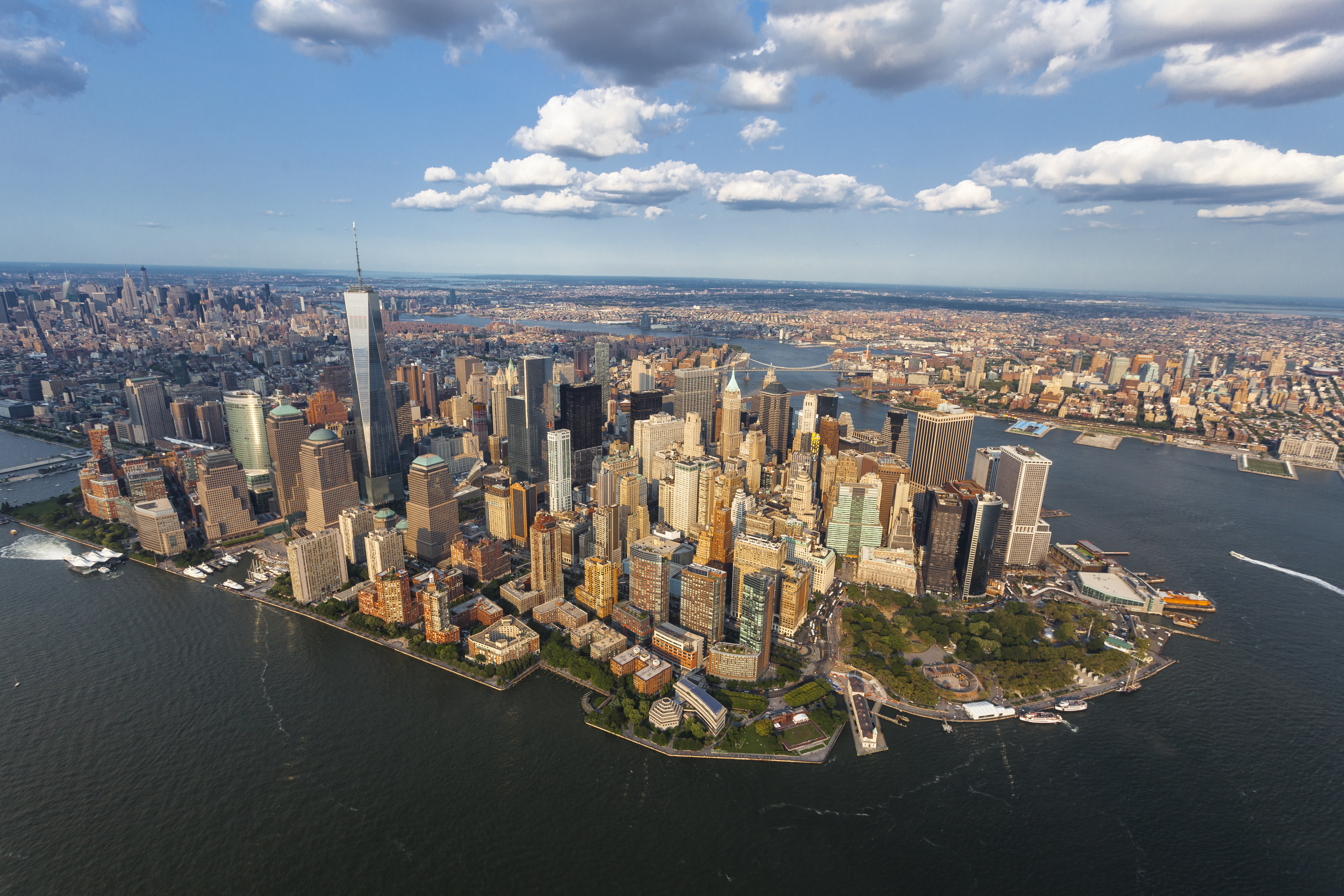
New York City, the world's principal fintech and financial center and the epicenter of the world's principal metropolitan economy

The word economy in English is derived from the Middle French's yconomie, which itself derived from the Medieval Latin's oeconomia. The Latin word has its origin at the Ancient Greek's oikonomia or oikonomos. The word's first part oikos means "house", and the second part nemein means "to manage".

The most frequently used current sense, denoting "the economic system of a country or an area", had not developed until the 1650s.

== History ==
=== Earliest roots ===
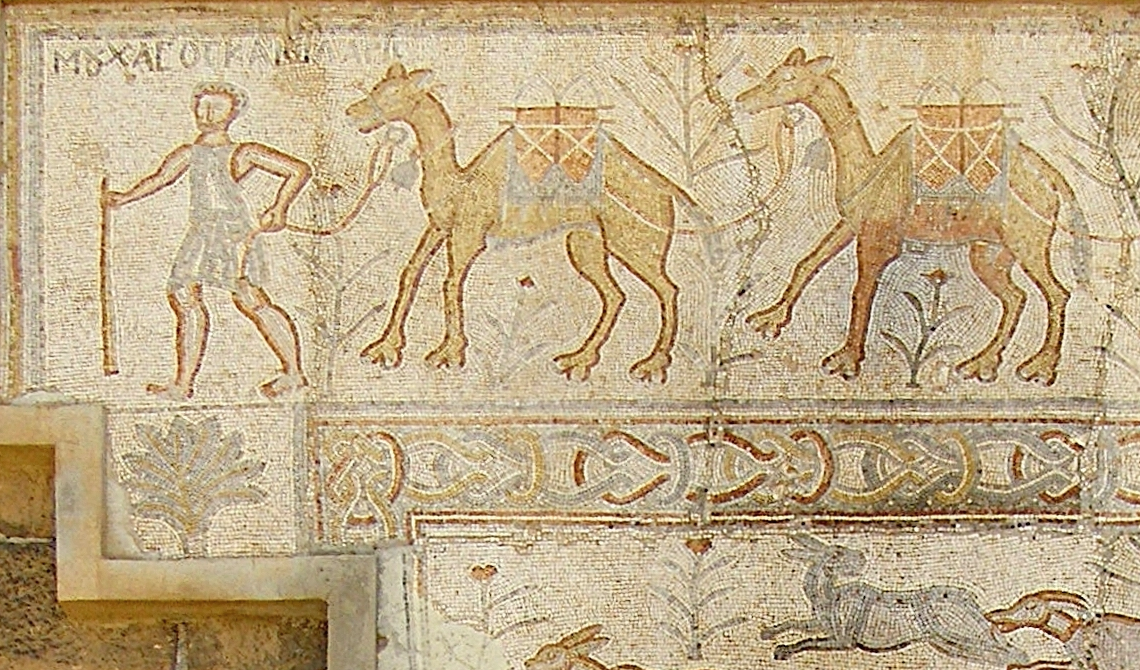
Ancient Roman mosaic from Bosra, depicting a merchant leading camels through the desert

As long as someone has been making, supplying and distributing goods or services, there has been some sort of economy; economies grew larger as societies grew and became more complex. Sumer developed a large-scale economy based on commodity money, while the Babylonians and their neighboring city states later developed the earliest system of economics as we think of, in terms of rules/laws on debt, legal contracts and law codes relating to business practices, and private property.

The Babylonians and their city-state neighbors developed forms of economics comparable to currently used civil society (law) concepts. They developed the first known codified legal and administrative systems, complete with courts, jails, and government records.

The ancient economy was based primarily on subsistence farming. The Shekel was the first reference to a unit of weight and currency, used by the Semitic peoples. The first usage of the term came from Mesopotamia circa 3000 BC. and referred to a specific mass of barley which related other values in a metric such as silver, bronze, copper, etc. A barley/shekel was originally both a unit of currency and a unit of weight, just as the British pound was originally a unit denominating a one-pound mass of silver.

Most exchange of goods had occurred through social relationships. There were also traders who bartered in marketplaces. In Ancient Greece, where the present English word 'economy' originated, many people were bond slaves of the freeholders. The economic discussion was driven by scarcity.

In Chinese economic law, the huge cycle of institutional innovation contains an idea. Serving a non-market economy promotes a firm's tenure that is legally guaranteed and protected from bureaucratic opportunities.

=== Middle Ages ===
In the Middle Ages, what is now known as an economy was not far from the subsistence level. Most exchange occurred within social groups. On top of this, the great conquerors raised what we now call venture capital (from ventura, ital.; risk) to finance their captures. The capital should be refunded by the goods they would bring up in the New World. The discoveries of Marco Polo (1254–1324), Christopher Columbus (1451–1506) and Vasco da Gama (1469–1524) led to a first global economy. The first enterprises were trading establishments. In 1513, the first stock exchange was founded in Antwerp. Economy at the time meant primarily trade.

The European captures became branches of the European states, the so-called colonies. The rising nation-states Spain, Portugal, France, Great Britain and the Netherlands tried to control the trade through custom duties and mercantilism (from mercator, lat.: merchant) was a first approach to intermediate between private wealth and public interest. The secularization in Europe allowed states to use the immense property of the church for the development of towns. The influence of the nobles decreased. The first Secretaries of State for economy started their work. Bankers like Amschel Mayer Rothschild (1773–1855) started to finance national projects such as wars and infrastructure. Economy from then on meant national economy as a topic for the economic activities of the citizens of a state.

=== Industrial Revolution ===
The first economist in the true modern meaning of the word was the Scotsman Adam Smith (1723–1790) who was inspired partly by the ideas of physiocracy, a reaction to mercantilism and also later Economics student, Adam Mari. He defined the elements of a national economy: products are offered at a natural price generated by the use of competition - supply and demand - and the division of labor. He maintained that the basic motive for free trade is human self-interest. The so-called self-interest hypothesis became the anthropological basis for economics. Thomas Malthus (1766–1834) transferred the idea of supply and demand to the problem of overpopulation.

The Industrial Revolution was a period from the 18th to the 19th century where major changes in agriculture, manufacturing, mining, and transport had a profound effect on the socioeconomic and cultural conditions starting in the United Kingdom, then subsequently spreading throughout Europe, North America, and eventually the world. The onset of the Industrial Revolution marked a major turning point in human history; almost every aspect of daily life was eventually influenced in some way. In Europe wild capitalism started to replace the system of mercantilism (today: protectionism) and led to economic growth. The period is called the Industrial Revolution because the system of production and division of labor enabled the mass production of goods.

=== 20th century ===
The contemporary concept of "the economy" wasn't popularly known until the American Great Depression in the 1930s.

After the chaos of two World Wars and the devastating Great Depression, policymakers searched for new ways of controlling the course of the economy. This was explored and discussed by Friedrich August von Hayek (1899–1992) and Milton Friedman (1912–2006) who pleaded for a global free trade and are supposed to be the fathers of the so-called neoliberalism. However, the prevailing view was that held by John Maynard Keynes (1883–1946), who argued for a stronger control of the markets by the state. The theory that the state can alleviate economic problems and instigate economic growth through state manipulation of aggregate demand is called Keynesianism in his honor. In the late 1950s, the economic growth in America and Europe—often called Wirtschaftswunder (German for economic miracle) —brought up a new form of economy: mass consumption economy. In 1958, John Kenneth Galbraith (1908–2006) was the first to speak of an affluent society in his book The Affluent Society. In most of the countries the economic system is called a social market economy.

=== 21st century ===
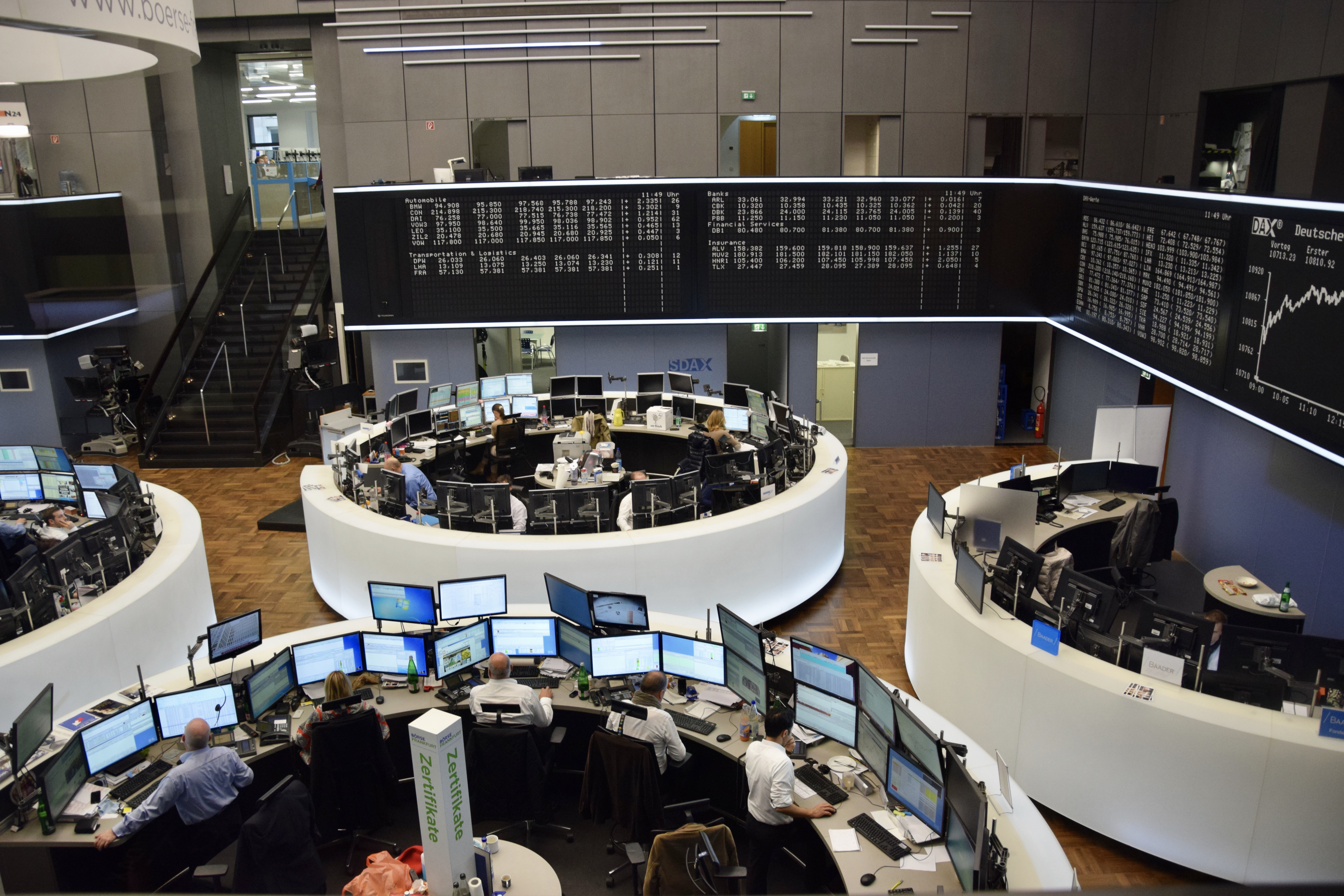
Frankfurt Stock Exchange in 2015

With the fall of the Iron Curtain and the transition of the countries of the Eastern Bloc towards democratic government and market economies, the idea of the post-industrial society is brought into importance as its role is to mark together the significance that the service sector receives instead of industrialization. Some attribute the first use of this term to Daniel Bell's 1973 book, The Coming of Post-Industrial Society, while others attribute it to social philosopher Ivan Illich's book, Tools for Conviviality. The term is also applied in philosophy to designate the fading of postmodernism in the late 90s and especially in the beginning of the 21st century.

With the spread of Internet as a mass media and communication medium especially after 2000–2001, the idea for the Internet and information economy is given place because of the growing importance of e-commerce and electronic businesses, also the term for a global information society as understanding of a new type of "all-connected" society is created. In the late 2000s, the new type of economies and economic expansions of countries like China, Brazil, and India bring attention and interest to economies different from the usually dominating Western-type economies and economic models.

== Elements ==
=== Types ===
A market economy is one where goods and services are produced and exchanged according to demand and supply between participants (economic agents) by barter or a medium of exchange with a credit or debit value accepted within the network, such as a unit of currency. A planned economy is one where political agents directly control what is produced and how it is sold and distributed. A green economy is low-carbon and resource efficient. In a green economy, growth in income and employment is driven by public and private investments that reduce carbon emissions and pollution, enhance energy and resource efficiency, and prevent the loss of biodiversity and ecosystem services. A gig economy is one in which short-term jobs are assigned or chosen on-demand. The global economy refers to humanity's economic system or systems overall. An informal economy is neither taxed nor monitored by any form of government. A local economy is an economy centred around a particular settlement or commercial area, and may be a driver for local purchasing being promoted and practiced in its area.

=== Sectors ===
The economy may be considered as having developed through the following phases or degrees of precedence:

- The ancient economy was mainly based on subsistence farming.
- The Industrial Revolution phase lessened the role of subsistence farming, converting it to more extensive and mono-cultural forms of agriculture in the last three centuries. The economic growth took place mostly in mining, construction and manufacturing industries. Commerce became more significant due to the need for improved exchange and distribution of produce throughout the community.
- In the economies of modern consumer societies phase there is a growing part played by services, finance, and technology—the knowledge economy.

In modern economies, these phase precedences are somewhat differently expressed by the three-sector model:

- Primary: Involves the extraction and production of raw materials, such as corn, coal, wood and iron.
- Secondary: Involves the transformation of raw or intermediate materials into goods e.g. manufacturing steel into cars, or textiles into clothing.
- Tertiary: Involves the provision of services to consumers and businesses, such as baby-sitting, cinema and banking.

Other sectors of the developed community include:

- the public sector or state sector (which usually includes: parliament, law-courts and government centers, various emergency services, public health, shelters for impoverished and threatened people, transport facilities, air/sea ports, post-natal care, hospitals, schools, libraries, museums, preserved historical buildings, parks/gardens, nature-reserves, some universities, national sports grounds/stadiums, national arts/concert-halls or theaters and centers for various religions).
- the private sector or privately run businesses.
- the voluntary sector or social sector.

=== Indicators ===
The gross domestic product (GDP) of a country is a measure of the size of its economy, or more specifically, monetary measure of the market value of all the final goods and services produced. The most conventional economic analysis of a country relies heavily on economic indicators like the GDP and GDP per capita. The median income represents the economic situation of the average person.

Real values, such as real GDP, are adjusted for inflation, while nominal values unadjusted for inflation.

The term real economy is used by analysts as well as politicians to denote the part of the economy that is concerned with the actual production of goods and services, as ostensibly contrasted with the paper economy, or the financial side of the economy, which is concerned with buying and selling on the financial markets.

== Studies ==
The study of economics are roughly divided into macroeconomics and microeconomics. Today, the range of fields of study examining the economy revolves around the social science of economics, but may also include sociology, history, anthropology, and geography. Practical fields directly related to the human activities involving production, distribution, exchange, and consumption of goods and services as a whole are business, engineering, government, and health care. Macroeconomics is studied at the regional and national levels, and common analyses include income and production, money, prices, employment, international trade, and other issues.

== See also ==
- Economic democracy
- Economic history
- Economic system
- Social economy
- Solidarity economy
- Abstract economy
- World economy
