= Russell Maroon Shoatz =

American Black nationalist activist and murderer (1943–2021)

- Poster for a documentary about Shoatz
- Born: Russell Melvin Shoatz II; August 23, 1943; Philadelphia, Pennsylvania, U.S.
- Died: December 17, 2021 (aged 78)
- Other names: Russell Shoats, Maroon, Harun Abdul Ra'uf

Russell Melvin Shoatz II (Note: Also spelled "Shoats" in court documents and some news stories.) (August 23, 1943 – December 17, 2021), also known as Maroon, was an American Black nationalist activist, writer, and convicted murderer. Raised in Philadelphia, Pennsylvania, Shoatz was a founder of a local group called the Black Unity Council and a member of the Black Panther Party and the Black Liberation Army. In 1972, he was convicted of the 1970 murder of Philadelphia police officer Frank Von Colln, as well as the shooting of another policeman who survived. He escaped from prison twice, for 27 days in 1977 and again for three days in 1980. After his second escape he was held in solitary confinement for the better part of three decades, including an uninterrupted period between 1991 and 2014. PM Press published a collection of his prison writings, which explore feminist and ecosocialist ideas, in 2013. He was released from solitary in February 2014, after filing a lawsuit against prison officials that attracted international attention. Suffering from advanced colorectal cancer, Shoatz was granted compassionate release in October 2021 and died less than two months later. His memoir, cowritten with Kanya D'Almeida, was published posthumously in 2024.

== Early life and activism ==
Shoatz grew up in Philadelphia, in a family of 13. His father worked as a long-haul trucker. His parents had come to Philadelphia from the South and he spent summers at his grandparents' farm in Georgia. In his memoir he describes a childhood of "quiet neglect...in a household stretched to its limits." He loved to read but hated school, where he was demeaned by White teachers. He writes of witnessing racist police violence from an early age. He became involved in gang activity and was in and out of juvenile detention. After the 1970 shootings a junior high school classmate wrote in The Philadelphia Inquirer that Shoatz had been intelligent and was voted "most likely to succeed," but "was always considered a bully." In his twenties he worked a variety of blue collar jobs (milkman, steelworker, cabdriver, machinist), as well as selling drugs and engaging in other criminal activities. Shoatz became more politically engaged after hearing Malcolm X speak in New York City in 1963. He began attending events and discussions at the Muntu Cultural Center, in an Afrocentric atmosphere shaped by the ideas of the Nation of Islam and the Revolutionary Action Movement.

In 1964 Shoatz married Thelma Christian, with whom he had four children before the couple separated in 1968. Shoatz physically abused Christian during this marriage. While still married to Christian, in the late 1960s he became involved with a fellow activist, Loretta Fairly (known as Bonnie). They had three children together.

In 1968 he founded the Black Unity Council (BUC) with other activists, originally with plans to create a community center. The BUC organized food drives and cultural events, intervened in gang conflicts, and campaigned against police brutality. They picketed a local telephone company over poor working conditions for switchboard operators (mostly Black women), in what Shoatz describes as their most successful campaign. One member estimated (decades later) that the BUC had about 30 members at one point. Shoatz participated in the riots that followed the April 1968 assassination of Martin Luther King, Jr., setting fire to White-owned businesses that he viewed as exploitative. Shoatz describes the police killing of a local Black boy after a traffic stop as a radicalizing moment for many BUC members. Lucas writes that by the summer of 1969, the BUC had shrunk to around 16 people, renamed itself the Black Liberation Army, and begun stockpiling weapons. After the police killings of Fred Hampton and Mark Clark in December 1969, this group opted to move closer to the Philadelphia chapter of the Black Panther Party, expecting further attacks.

== 1970 shootings ==
On August 29, 1970, Philadelphia Park Guard (Note: At the time, Fairmount Park had its own police department, which was later folded into the Philadelphia Police Department.) policeman James Harrington was shot and seriously wounded by a man who flagged down his patrol car. Soon after, Park Guard Sergeant Frank Von Colln (aged 43, a Navy veteran and father of four), who had just dispatched two officers to investigate Harrington's shooting, was shot and killed in the Cobbs Creek Park Guardhouse in West Philadelphia. Shoatz writes of the guardhouse attack: "I will not jeopardize any party’s freedom or safety by revealing what I know about that attack, but I must state for the record that it was carried out in accord with, and at the behest of, the leadership of the Black Panther Party.” Two other officers were shot and wounded in the same neighborhood a day later.

Philadelphia police commissioner Frank Rizzo told reporters that the killers "should be strung up...they deserve no mercy under the law, society has made it too easy for these people." Rizzo responded by raiding Panther party headquarters, arresting 15 people. Gunfire was exchanged during these raids, in which three police were lightly wounded by shotgun pellets. Police publicly strip-searched the arrested Panthers, resulting in photographs that circulated in the national media. These events took place less than a week before the Revolutionary People's Constitutional Convention organized by the Black Panthers at Temple University. In 1996 Von Colln's son Kurt Von Colln (19 at the time of the shooting) told reporters, "This completely changed my whole life. I never thought I could hate the way I did after this happened. I was the son of a man who loved everyone." A playground near the Philadelphia Museum of Art was named after Von Colln.

== Arrest and trial ==
In the days after the shootings, three suspects (Hugh S. Williams and the brothers Alvin and Robert Joyner) were arrested by Philadelphia police, with a fourth (Fred Burton) surrendering a month later. Willams was arrested the night of the shootings when a policeman saw him putting a bag containing a handgun and a hand grenade under a parked car. Police began searching for Shoatz and a sixth suspect, Richard Thomas. In January 1972, after two years on the run, Shoatz was arrested in West Philadelphia along with six others after a passerby told police she had seen three men "acting funny" in an alley. He was carrying a suitcase containing automatic weapons and ammunition at the time of his arrest. Shoatz was arraigned on an array of charges, including murder, assault with intent to kill, and sedition. In May 1982, a policeman was shot and injured during an abortive attempt to free Shoatz and Robert Joyner from custody. Larry Howard, who had been arrested with Shoatz in January but released on bail, was convicted of this shooting the following year.

At trial prosecutors described Shoatz as the "mastermind" of the guardhouse attack and said that he had "made it possible" by shooting Harrington first. A homicide detective testified that under interrogation Shoatz had denied being present at the scene of the shooting, but said "Fundamentally, I did" when asked whether he had killed Von Colln. Eyewitness testimony placing him at the scene was also presented. In October 1972, he was convicted of first degree murder, assault and battery with intent to murder, aggravated robbery and conspiracy. He was sentenced to life imprisonment, which at the time had no possibility of parole in Pennsylvania. (Note: This changed in 2026, when the state Supreme Court ruled that mandatory life sentences without parole for defendants convicted of felony murder violated the state constitution's prohibition on cruel punishments.) The four others arrested in 1970 were also charged, convicted and sentenced to life in prison in connection with Von Colln's murder. Thomas, the sixth suspect, was arrested in Chicago in 1996 after decades of living under assumed names; he was acquitted in 1998.

== Incarceration ==
=== Escape attempts ===
In the early years of his imprisonment, Shoatz converted to Sunni Islam, adopting the name Harun Abdul Ra'uf. He writes that he "found tremendous solace in turning to a higher power—it was balm to the chafing reality of life in Graterford, where, to the guards, we barely qualified as human beings." Shoatz writes that he began trying to escape close to the start of his sentence. After several unsuccessful attempts, in September 1977, Shoatz and three other inmates took over a cell block at SCI—Huntingdon, held six guards hostage for an hour, and fled the prison. Two of the other inmates were quickly recaptured and a third was killed during the escape attempt. Two guards sustained minor injuries. Shoatz kidnapped a prison guard and his wife and son from their house near the prison, forcing them to drive south and west before fleeing into the woods near Cokeburg when their car broke down. He was captured on October 11 after a carjacking in Marianna. Charged with kidnapping and other crimes, he described himself as a "runaway slave" at his arraignment.

Shoatz has described being beaten, harassed, and served contaminated food after his return to prison. Fearing that his food would be poisoned, he stopped eating anything other than commissary and vending machine food. In court he attacked his own attorney after he refused to pursue a line of questioning that Shoatz requested. Shoatz was convicted and moved to Farview State Hospital for the Criminally Insane (now part of SCI – Waymart) while he awaited sentencing. He was diagnosed with schizophrenia. For a time he was sedated with Thorazine until he began secretly spitting out his nightly dose.

At Farview Shoatz started a relationship with a young activist from Pittsburgh named Phyllis Hill (known as Oshun). In March 1980, Shoatz and another patient, Clifford Futch (known as Lumumba), escaped after Hill smuggled in a submachine gun and two handguns. They hoped to make their way to Cuba, which Assata Shakur had spoken of in communiqués released after her own escape from prison a few months before. Within three days they encountered a hunter, who alerted authorities. After a two hour standoff with police and FBI agents, in which gunfire was exchanged but no one was injured, the group surrendered.

=== Solitary confinement ===
On his return to prison, Shoatz was placed in solitary confinement and shuffled between SCI—Dallas, SCI—Pittsburgh, Farview, and other facilities. In July 1980, he was sentenced to an additional 19 1/2 to 39 1/2 years in connection with his first escape attempt. Brought to trial on charges stemming from his second escape attempt, Shoatz represented himself and called Philadelphia police officers and FBI agents as witnesses, seeking to establish himself as a political prisoner rather than a common criminal. Joined by other prisoners, he went on a series of hunger strikes, eventually attracting attention from activists outside the prison and winning a return to general population. In January 1982, Shoatz, Futch, and another inmate were charged with leading a riot at SCI—Dallas the previous April. (Note: Shoatz writes that this riot was set off by intrusive daily cell searches, unfair administrative review processes, and the beating of another inmate by guards.) In 1983, at SCI—Pittsburgh, he was placed back in solitary after he was elected to lead a prison group called the Pennsylvania Association of Lifers, which intended to lobby lawmakers for the abolition of life without parole sentences. In 1984, he was sentenced to a second life sentence in connection with the escape from Farview.

Shoatz would spend most of the next three decades in solitary, including an uninterrupted stretch between June 1991 and February 2014. He describes organizing "seminars" with other inmates in solitary in the 1980s and 1990s, studying various global revolutionary and national liberation movements (Palestinian groups, the PAIGC, the Red Army Faction, the LTTE). Prison documents made public in the 2010s (through his lawsuit) cited his involvement “with radical militant groups, his former association with the Black Panther Party, and his current political views and activities via mail and phone, his ability to organize others” as reasons for his confinement. In 2016, the director of the ACLU's National Prison Project commented that Shoatz "was famous within the Pennsylvania system, so I do think that played into why he was placed into solitary confinement." His status was reviewed every 30 to 90 days, each time with prison officials determining that he was an escape risk. In May 2000, the Third Circuit Court of Appeals declined to order Shoatz's release from solitary, describing him as "a remorseless sociopath knowledgeable in the workings of prisons and escape techniques, capable of leading other inmates in such undertakings, and inclined to do so." At a court deposition in the 2010s, a prison superintendent stated that Shoatz was kept in solitary to prevent "retribution against staff." In later years, Shoatz was held in a soundproofed 7x12 foot cell lit by overhead lights 24 hours a day, prevented from talking to other prisoners, and only allowed out to exercise one hour a day, five days a week.

=== Lawsuit and release ===
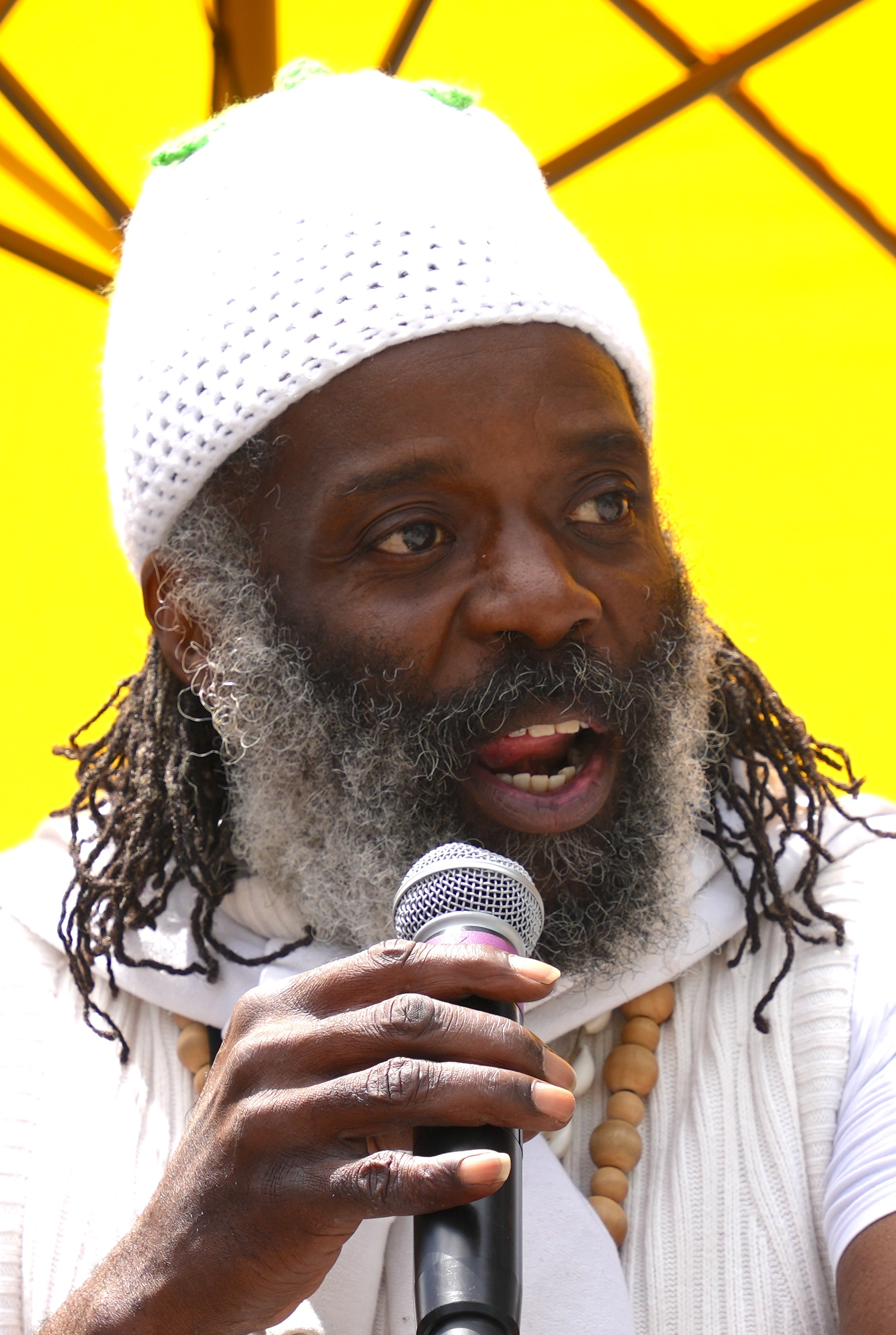
Shoatz's son, Russell Shoatz III, advocated for his release from prison.

In 2012, Shoatz's family and supporters (including Herman Ferguson, Mumia Abu-Jamal, Fred Ho, Arturo O'Farrill, and Magdalena Gómez) publicly launched a campaign calling for his release. In May 2013, he filed a lawsuit against prison officials alleging that he was being subjected to cruel and unusual punishment and that the prison's administrative review process violated his due process rights. The Abolitionist Law Center (ALC), a prison abolitionist NGO based in Pittsburgh, represented Shoatz in this suit, later joined by pro bono representation from Reed Smith. Shoatz was the ALC's first client. (Note: Robert Saleem Holbrook, the ALC's second client and later its executive director, has described Shoatz as being a mentor while they were both incarcerated.)

In February 2014, a month after a judge declined to dismiss the suit, Shoatz was released into the prison's general population. Shoatz told the court that his isolation in solitary had led to severe mental health problems that persisted after his return to general population. The case attracted international attention, with UN Special Rapporteur on Torture Juan E. Méndez testifying on Shoatz's behalf. Five Nobel Peace Prize laureates (Jose Ramos-Horta, Mairead Corrigan Maguire, Archbishop Desmond Tutu, Jody Williams, and Adolfo Perez Esquivel) expressed support for Shoatz's case. In 2016 the lawsuit ended in a settlement in which the Pennsylvania Department of Corrections agreed not to return Shoatz to solitary based on his past infractions; he was also awarded $99,000. Frank Von Colln's son Kurt Von Colln called the settlement "completely ridiculous," adding, "This guy is in there for killing a police officer and he's not been a model prisoner." Shoatz agreed not to engage in political activism as part of his return to general population.

Suffering from advanced colorectal cancer, Shoatz was granted compassionate release on October 26, 2021. After Shoatz's release Republican members of the Pennsylvania state legislature announced that they would introduce legislation restricting judges from granting early release in similar cases. Shoatz died less than two months later, on December 17, at the age of 78. He expressed regret for his part in the attacks on Von Colln and Harrington near the end of his life.

== Writing ==
In 2013, PM Press published a collection of Shoatz's writings, Maroon the Implacable, mostly consisting of previously unpublished essays originally written for fellow prisoners. The book was edited by musician and activist Fred Ho (who Shoatz credited as an influence on his thinking) and Quincy Saul, and includes a foreword by Chuck D. Ho first made contact with Shoatz while doing prisoner support work for Mumia Abu-Jamal in the 1990s. The book was blurbed by Amiri Baraka, Hakim Bey, Silvia Federici, and others. In these essays Shoatz engages with feminist and ecosocialist ideas, reflects on the shortcomings of the Black Panther movement, and discusses the lessons of historical maroon communities for future revolutionary organizing. In a 1994-95 piece ("Black Fighting Formations"), He praises the attacks on police carried out by the BLA and similar actors, faulting however their lack of "an adequate political apparatus to replenish their forces" and failure "to integrate local street gangs into their activities." In "The Dragon and the Hydra" (2006), he advocates for "decentralized formations" against the idea of a vanguard party, pointing to the history of resistance to slavery in Suriname, Jamaica, the United States, and Haiti as historical examples.

Steve Bloom, reviewing the book from a Marxist perspective in Against the Current magazine, praised Shoatz's writing as both accessible and insightful, "a rare combination." Bloom placed a feminist essay from 2010 ("Respect Our Mothers, Stop Hating Women") in the context of the masculine Black nationalist milieu in which Shoatz spent his youth and his current all-male prison surroundings: "This piece thus represents a significant personal testament by a human being who successfully challenged both himself and the culture which surrounds him." A review by a fellow prisoner in News and Letters praised Shoatz as "an intrepid spirit of a human being who has a largeness of heart embracing the whole of humanity," also noting his engagement with Maria Mies and Veronika Bennholdt-Thomsen. Publishers Weekly described the book as "an engrossing portrayal of a life contemplated from the recesses of 20 years in solitary confinement," drawing attention to Shoatz's feminist and anticapitalist stances. In 2021, a conversation between Shoatz and his son Russell Shoatz III appeared in the essay collection Abolition for the People, edited by Colin Kaepernick and published by Kaepernick Publishing.

Shoatz's memoir, I Am Maroon: The True Story of an American Political Prisoner, cowritten with the Sri Lankan writer Kanya D'Almeida, was posthumously published in 2024. Shoatz wrote the first draft in response to questions his daughter Sharon had asked him about his life. In 2013, D'Almeida was introduced to Shoatz by Ho, who initially approached her with the idea of writing a screenplay about Shoatz's life as a tool in the campaign to win Shoatz's release from solitary. D'Almeida's husband was also involved in editing Shoatz's first book. Shoatz and D'Almeida worked together off and on until his death. In interviews D'Almeida has discussed the sometimes challenging process of finding common ground with Shoatz, mentioning their differing views on armed struggle (the LTTE insurgency in particular) and Shoatz's behavior towards women earlier in life: "We had to chip away at one another’s illiteracy for many years before we could proceed in a spirit of real solidarity." Kirkus Reviews described the book: "Tense, fast-paced chapters ably capture his fire and anger. A raw, unvarnished memoir." A review in Publishers Weekly concluded: "Shoatz is an impassioned and endearing narrator, clear-eyed about his mistakes even as he pushes back on his treatment by Pennsylvania prosecutors. Not every reader will be swayed by his worldview, but those interested in the Panthers and their legacy would do well to check this out."

== Books ==
- Shoatz, Russell Maroon; Ho, Fred (ed.); Saul, Quincy (ed.); Chuck D; Meyer, Matt; Madlala-Routledge, Nozizwe (2013). Maroon the Implacable: The Collected Writings of Russell Maroon Shoatz. PM Press. ISBN 9781604860597
- Shoatz, Russell; D'Almeida, Kanya (2024). I Am Maroon: The True Story of an American Political Prisoner. Bold Type Books. ISBN 9781645030492.
