= Claudia von Werlhof =

German sociologist

- Born: 17 May 1943 (age 83); Stahnsdorf, Berlin, Germany
- Occupations: Sociologist and political scientist

Claudia von Werlhof (born 17 May 1943) is a German sociologist and political scientist. She held the first professorship for women's studies in Austria, based at the Institute for Political Science at the University of Innsbruck.

== Life ==
After graduating from high school in Cologne in 1963, Werlhof studied economics and sociology in Cologne and Hamburg. In 1968, she received her Diplom in economics and sociology. From 1968 to 70, she was awarded a doctoral scholarship from the Friedrich-Ebert-Stiftung in El Salvador and Costa Rica. In 1974, she received her doctorate in sociology at the University of Cologne. In 1974/75 she was a lecturer at the Department of Social Sciences at the University of Frankfurt am Main. From 1977 to 79, she did research in Venezuela.

From 1975 to 1986, Werlhof worked as a research assistant at the Faculty of Sociology at Bielefeld University with a focus on development policy, where she helped to establish the practice area Women and Third World together with Veronika Bennholdt-Thomsen (de). In 1984, Werlhof habilitated in political science at the University of Frankfurt with a thesis on the woman question and agriculture policy in the Third World. She was a lecturer and visiting professor at various universities in Germany and abroad. In 1988, she was appointed full professor of Austrian political studies with a special focus on women's studies at the Institute for Political Science of the Faculty of Social and Economic Sciences at the University of Innsbruck. This was the first professorship for women's studies in Austria. Werlhof retired in 2011.

Claudia von Werlhof is the mother of a son.

== Work ==
Claudia von Werlhof was involved in the women's movement from the very beginning. She is considered a co-founder of women's studies in the Federal Republic of Germany. Her research and publications have dealt with the theoretical and political questions of the women's movement and feminist theory.

Together with Maria Mies and Veronika Bennholdt-Thomsen, she is a co-founder of ecofeminism and developed the feminist Bielefeld subsistence perspective, which took up the subsistence approach of Georg Elwert et al. and emphasized that subsistence production is not only an important component in developing countries, but also plays a major role in capitalist Societies of the Center: the domestic work of women reduces the reproductive costs of the male wage worker and thus subsidizes the capitalist sector. They thus linked the debate on domestic work that was conducted in the women's movement in the 1980s, with the women's question, the Third World question, and later the ecological question, and also refuted in empirical studies that subsistence producers in the Third World were gradually becoming wage workers. Instead, they argued, work was being pushed back into the domestic sphere, where women produce for low wages for the world market. The sociologists in Bielefeld called this process housewife-making. They analysed that subsistence production, which serves the immediate creation and maintenance of life, is subject to a constant social devaluation process, which, according to Werlhof, is linked to the modern understanding of nature and is not gender-neutral. Subsistence economy as the creation of the basis of life not only would not disappear in traditional societies, but would be subordinated to the capitalist commodity economy. The devaluation of subsistence would go hand in hand with the devaluation of the people associated with it. Werlhof and her comrades-in-arms saw their approach as a critical theory of society; at the same time, they were concerned with changing this reality. Through subsistence perspective, they analyzed regionalization and appreciation of the subsistence-oriented supply economy even under globalized conditions, and thus the strengthening of women as subsistence producers. Per the authors, in the subsistence economy, there could also be money, trade and markets. "With its specific methodological reference, this approach opened the field for an international perspective of feminist research, which takes into account the residents of the Cologne women's shelter as well as Venezuelan peasant women or Indian homeworkers. The Bielefeld subsistence perspective was further developed within and outside of scientific research, various groups and initiatives related to it, which led to the founding of the Institut für Theorie und Praxis der Subsistenz e.V. in Bielefeld in 1995.

Controversial debates about the subsistence approach were sparked in the women's movement. The social education worker Iman Attia, for example, accused eco-feminism and Werlhof's and her fellow campaigners' perspective on subsistence of mythologizing the housewife and mother, which only intensified the oppression they were trying to fight. The authors' emphasis on the female subsistence economy stands in contrast to emancipation through participation in gainful employment, which for von Werlhof and other representatives of the critical theory of patriarchy will not lead to emancipation but only to the perpetuation of patriarchal power relations. This also results in a contradiction between the classical women's studies represented by von Werlhof and the more recent approach of gender studies.

In further research work and publications, Claudia von Werlhof focused on criticism of globalization and civil society alternatives to globalization, which she describes as dissidence, and condensed them into a "theory-practice approach of a critical theory of patriarchy." In 2007 she founded the association FIPAZ (Research Institute for Patriarchal Criticism and Alternative Civilizations) and in 2010 the association Planetare Bewegung für Mutter Erde (Planetary Movement for Mother Earth).

== Controversy ==
In February 2010, von Werlhof came under criticism when she brought up a conspiracy theory in an interview with Der Standard. According to this theory, the United States had a technology to trigger artificial earthquakes using HAARP, and the 2010 Haiti earthquake could have been caused by this. Ferdinand Karlhofer, director of the Institute of Political Science at the University of Innsbruck, distanced himself from the conspiracy theory, which lacked any scientific basis, and spoke of "damage" to the Institute's reputation. Werlhof replied in an open letter that she had given an interview "personally and by no means on behalf of the Institute," and as a result, she could not have done any harm to the Institute. She also raised the question whether the "scientific understanding of the institute" was "guided by political interests."

== Publications (selection) ==
- Frauen, die letzte Kolonie. Zur Hausfrauisierung der Arbeit, mit Maria Mies und Veronika Bennholdt-Thomsen, Rowohlt Taschenbuch Verlag, Reinbek 1983, ISBN 3-499-12239-1 (und 1985, 1988 sowie 3. Aufl. Zürich 1992)
- Wenn die Bauern wiederkommen. Frauen, Arbeit und Agrobusiness in Venezuela, Edition CON, Bremen 1985, ISBN 978-3-88526-305-0 (zugleich Habilitationsschrift, Universität Frankfurt (Main) 1984)
- Männliche Natur und künstliches Geschlecht. Texte zur Erkenntniskrise der Moderne, Milena Verlag, Wien 1991, ISBN 3-900399-51-4
- Was haben die Hühner mit dem Dollar zu tun? Frauen und Ökonomie, Frauenoffensive, München 1991, ISBN 3-88104-213-X
- Mutter-Los. Frauen im Patriarchat zwischen Angleichung und Dissidenz, Frauenoffensive, München 1996, ISBN 3-88104-274-1
- Krieg ohne Grenzen. Die neue Kolonisierung der Welt, mit Maria Mies, Papyrossa Verlag, Köln 2004, ISBN 978-3-89438-286-5
- West-End. Das Scheitern der Moderne als „kapitalistisches Patriarchat“ und die Logik der Alternativen, Papyrossa Verlag, Köln 2004, ISBN 978-3-89438-286-5
- Über die Liebe zum Gras an der Autobahn. Analysen, Polemiken und Erfahrungen in der ‚Zeit des Bumerang‘, Christel Göttert Verlag, Rüsselsheim 2010, ISBN 978-3-939623-21-2 (und 2010)
- Vom Diesseits der Utopie zum Jenseits der Gewalt. Feministisch-patriarchatskritische Analysen – Blicke in die Zukunft?, Centaurus Verlag, Herbolzheim 2010, ISBN 978-3-86226-273-1 (Springer-Link)
- Die Verkehrung. Das Projekt des Patriarchats und das Gender-Dilemma, Promedia Verlag, Wien 2011, ISBN 978-3-85371-332-7

Articles

- Frauenarbeit, der blinde Fleck in der Kritik der Politischen Ökonomie, Beiträge zur feministischen Theorie und Praxis, no. 1, 1978.
- The failure of the "Modern World System" and the new paradigm of the "Critical Theory of Patriarchy": The "civilization of alchimists" as a "system war", in: Salvatore Babones, Christopher Chase-Dunn (Hrsg.): Routledge International Handbook of World-Systems Analysis, Routledge (Verlag) 2012, ISBN 978-0-415-56364-2, S. 172ff

Herausgeberschaft

- Beiträge zur Dissidenz, Buchreihe (28 Bände), Peter Lang Verlag, Frankfurt/M. 1996–2015
- Herren-Los. Herrschaft-Erkenntnis-Lebensform, mit Annemarie Schweighofer und Werner W. Ernst, Peter Lang Verlag, Frankfurt/M. 1996, ISBN 3-631-48801-7
- Lizenz zum Plündern. Das Multilaterale Abkommen über Investitionen MAI, mit Maria Mies, EVA/Rotbuch Verlag, Hamburg 1998, ISBN 3-434-53017-7
- Subsistenz und Widerstand. Alternativen zur Globalisierung, mit Veronika Bennholdt-Thomsen und Nicholas Faraclas, Promedia Verlag, Wien 2003, ISBN 978-3-85371-205-4

== Bibliography ==
- Birgit Seemann: Vom Verhältnis von Staat und Kapital und Patriarchat (Claudia von Werlhof), in: Feministische Staatstheorie. Der Staat in der deutschen Frauen- und Patriarchtasforschung, Verlag Leske und Budrich, Opladen 1996, ISBN 978-3-8100-1675-1, S. 69ff
- Mathias Behmann et al. (Hrsg.): Verantwortung – Anteilnahme – Dissidenz : Patriarchatskritik als Verteidigung des Lebendigen. Festschrift zum 70. Geburtstag von Claudia von Werlhof, Peter Lang Verlag, Frankfurt a. Main 2013, ISBN 978-3-631-63979-5
