= Veronika Bennholdt-Thomsen =

German ethnologist and sociologist

Veronika Bennholdt-Thomsen (born 12 September 1944 in Seefeld in Tirol) is a German ethnologist and sociologist. She has also lived in Mexico since 1966, first for study, then for research.

== Life ==
Veronika Bennholdt-Thomsen was awarded her doctorate in 1973 with the ethnological thesis On the Definition of the Indio: The Social, Economic and Cultural Position of the Indios in Mexico at the Faculty of Philosophy of the University of Cologne. She habilitated at Bielefeld University in 1982 with the sociological paper Peasants in Mexico, between subsistence and commodity production.

From the beginning she was involved in the women's movement and became a co-creator of German women's studies. She published numerous books and articles, which were also translated into several languages, on the following topics: social movements of peasants and womans, feminist social theory, alternative economic theory, matriarchy research.

Bennholdt-Thomsen has worked as a lecturer and visiting professor at various universities, for example in Innsbruck, at the University of Natural Resources and Life Sciences in Vienna, for "rural women's studies" at the Humboldt University of Berlin and in the field of women's studies at the University of Klagenfurt. At Bielefeld University, she established the subject "Women and the Third World" as a temporary professor over a period of five years (1983-88). In 1997 she was appointed honorary professor at the University of Natural Resources and Life Sciences, Vienna. In 2005 and 2006 she advised the Centre for Research and Advanced Studies in Social Anthropology (Ciesas) in Oaxaca, Mexico, on the development of a master's degree course, particularly in women's studies. She is director of the private Institute for Theory and Practice of Subsistence e. V. (ITPS) in Bielefeld.

== Works ==
as author:

- Bauern in Mexiko: zwischen Subsistenz- und Warenproduktion. Campus, Frankfurt am Main/New York 1982, ISBN 3-593-33167-5 (Habilitationsschrift Universität Bielefeld 1982).
- Frauen, die letzte Kolonie: Zur Hausfrauisierung der Arbeit. Rowohlt, Reinbek 1988 (1983), ISBN 3-499-12239-1 (zusammen mit Maria Mies und Claudia von Werlhof.)
- Eine Kuh für Hillary: Die Subsistenzperspektive. Frauenoffensive, München 1997, ISBN 3-88104-294-6 (zusammen mit Maria Mies).
- Frauen-Wirtschaft: Juchitán, Mexikos Stadt der Frauen. Frederking & Thaler, München 2000, ISBN 3-89405-406-9 (zusammen mit Mechthild Müser und Cornelia Suhan).
- Ohne Menschen keine Wirtschaft. Oder: Wie gesellschaftlicher Reichtum entsteht: Berichte aus einer ländlichen Region in Ostwestfalen. Oekom, München 2005, ISBN 3-936581-67-3 (zusammen mit Andrea Baier und Brigitte Holzer).
- Geld oder Leben: Was uns wirklich reich macht. Oekom, München 2010, ISBN 978-3-86581-195-0.

as editor:

- Internationale Verflechtung und soziale Kämpfe. 2. Auflage. Olle & Wolter, Berlin 1980, ISBN 3-921241-42-1.
- Verelendungsprozesse und Widerstandsformen. Olle & Wolter, Berlin 1980, ISBN 3-88395-402-0.
- Juchitan – Stadt der Frauen: Vom Leben im Matriarchat. Rowohlt, Reinbek 1994, ISBN 3-499-13396-2 (Aufsatzsammlung).
- zusammen mit Christa Müller u. a.: Das Subsistenzhandbuch: Widerstandskulturen in Europa, Asien und Lateinamerika. Promedia, Wien 1999, ISBN 3-85371-143-X.
- zusammen mit Nicholas Faraclas und Claudia von Werlhof: There is an Alternative: Subsistence and Worldwide Resistance to Corporate Globalization. Sphinifex Press, North Melbourne, Victoria 2001, ISBN 1-84277-006-3 (englisch).
