= Kanya D'Almeida =

Sri Lankan writer and journalist

- Born: Colombo, Sri Lanka
- Education: Hampshire College; Columbia University
- Occupations: author, writer, journalist
- Writing career
- Notable awards: Commonwealth Short Story Prize (2021)

Kanya D'Almeida is a Sri Lankan writer and journalist. She won the 2021 Commonwealth Short Story Prize for her short story I Cleaned The.

== Career ==
She obtained her MFA in fiction from the Columbia University's School of the Arts in Massachusetts, USA. She studied English and Political Science at the Hampshire College. After completing her Bachelor's degree, she pursued her career in journalism and worked as journalist for about ten years.

During her career as a freelance journalist, she covered the most human rights issues in Sri Lanka, Mexico and the United States and her journalism work has appeared in Al Jazeera, TruthOut, Alternet and The Margins. She revealed that she learnt the art of creative writing from veteran American writer and professor Victor LaValle when she was pursuing her higher studies in the US.

She also pursued her interest in writing short stories often based on the mental illnesses encountered by women in the society. Her fiction stories have also appeared in the Jaggery and The Bangalore Review. She also hosts the podcast, The Darkest Light which critically analyse about the birth and the motherhood in Sri Lanka.

In May 2021, she was adjudged as the regional winner of the Commonwealth Short Story Prize from Asia. Her short story I Cleaned The was also shortlisted as one of the 25 short stories for the overall 2021 Commonwealth Short Story Prize. The short story was based on the dirty work which includes the domestic labour, human waste and abandonment.

On 30 June 2021, she was officially announced as the overall winner of the 2021 Commonwealth Short Story Prize during an online ceremony by the Commonwealth Foundation. She also became the first Sri Lankan to win the Commonwealth Short Story Prize and only the second person from Asia to win the award.

D'Almeida was the coauthor of Russell Maroon Shoatz's memoir, I Am Maroon, posthumously published in 2024.

== Personal life ==
D'Almeida is married and has a child.
