= Fred Ho =

American saxophonist, composer, bandleader, writer and activist (1957–2014)

Fred Ho 侯维翰
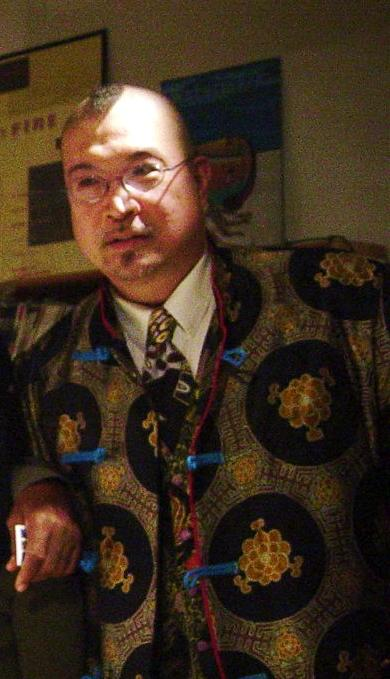
- Ho in 2005

Background information
- Also known as: Hóu Wéihàn
- Born: Fred Wei-han Houn; August 10, 1957; Palo Alto, California, U.S.
- Died: April 12, 2014 (aged 56) Brooklyn, New York, U.S.
- Genres: Jazz
- Occupations: Composer, bandleader, playwright, writer and Marxist social activist
- Instrument: Baritone saxophone
- Years active: 1985–2011
- Label: Soul Note Records

Fred Ho (Chinese: 侯维翰; pinyin: Hóu Wéihàn; born Fred Wei-han Houn; August 10, 1957 – April 12, 2014) was an American jazz baritone saxophonist, composer, bandleader, playwright, writer and Marxist social activist.

== Biography ==
Ho was born into a Chinese-American family in Palo Alto, California. When he was six, his father took a job teaching political science at the University of Massachusetts and the family moved with him. As a teenager he began teaching himself baritone saxophone and auditing college courses taught by Archie Shepp and others. He served in the Marine Corps, from which he was discharged in 1975—in his account, he fought an officer for using a racial slur. In 1979, he graduated from Harvard University with a degree in sociology. He was briefly a member of the Nation of Islam and then I Wor Kuen. He changed his surname to "Ho" in 1988.

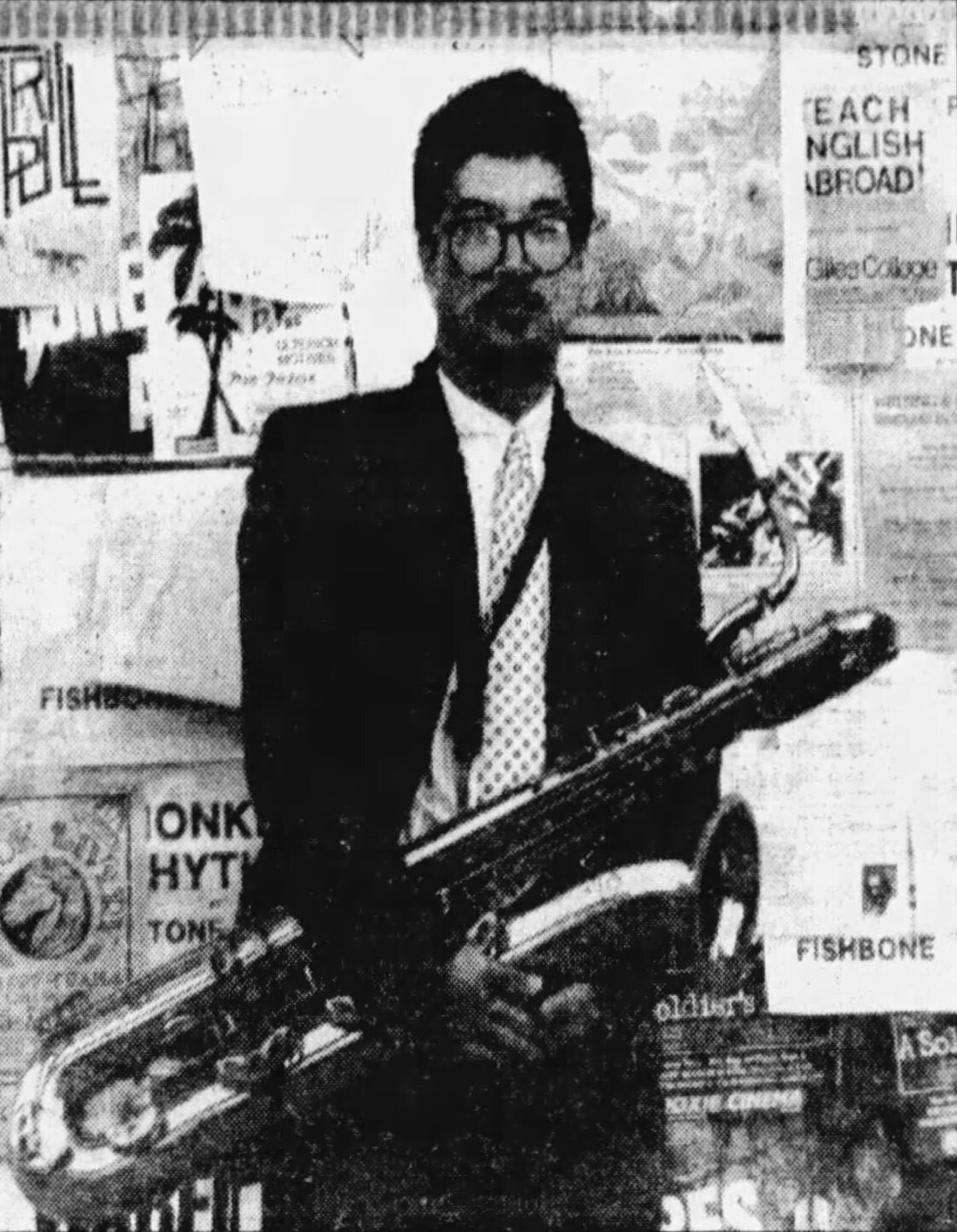
Ho c. 1987

While he is sometimes associated with the Asian-American jazz or avant-garde jazz movements, Ho himself was opposed to the use of term "jazz" to describe traditional African-American music because the word "jazz" had sometimes been used pejoratively by white Americans to denigrate the music of African Americans.

Ho sought to define what constitutes Asian-American jazz: "What makes Chinese American music Chinese American? What would comprise an Asian American musical content and form that could transform American music in general rather than simply be subsumed in one or another American musical genre such as 'jazz'?" He polemicized against "the white assimilationist notion of the petty bourgeois Asian American artist that anything by an Asian American artist makes it Asian American," pointing out that, for instance, "Yo-Yo Ma is a cellist who happens to be Chinese/Asian American, not a Chinese/Asian American musician."

In his role as an activist, many of his works fuse the melodies of indigenous and traditional Asian and African forms of music. He envisioned his music to be a real synthesis: "In opposing cultural imperialism, a genuine multicultural synthesis embodies revolutionary internationalism in music: rather than co-opting different cultures, musicians and composers achieve revolutionary transformation predicated upon anti-imperialism in terms of both musical respect and integrity as well as a practical political economic commitment to equality between peoples."

Ho also co-edited four books: Sounding Off! Music as Subversion/Resistance/Revolution (1996), Legacy to Liberation: Politics and Culture of Revolutionary Asian Pacific America (2001), Afro Asia: Revolutionary Political and Cultural Connections between African Americans and Asian Americans (2008), and Maroon the Implacable: The Collected Writings of Russell Maroon Shoatz (2013). Ho's contributions to the Asian-American empowerment movement are varied and many. He is credited with co-founding several Asian-American civic groups such as the East Coast Asian Students Union (while a student at Harvard), the Asian American Arts Alliance in New York City, the Asian American Resource Center in Boston and the Asian Improv record label.

Ho specialized in the combining sometimes asynchronous tunes and melodies of various musical traditions, creating what many have described as both brilliant and chaotic sounds. He was the first to combine Chinese opera with traditional African-American music. He led the Afro Asian Music Ensemble (founded in 1982) and the Monkey Orchestra (founded in 1980). He lived in Greenpoint, Brooklyn, New York.

He recorded for the Koch Jazz and Soul Note labels. Some of his final works include Deadly She-Wolf Assassin at Armageddon, which premiered in Philadelphia, Pennsylvania, in June 2006, and Voice of the Dragon I, II, and III. As Ho was a prolific composer, writer, playwright, his list of works grew continually. Some of his first CDs include Monkey I, Monkey II, The Underground Railroad to My Heart (Soul Note), We Refuse To Be Used And Abused, and Tomorrow is Now!

In his 2000 book, Legacy to Liberation, Ho, recapitulating an aesthetic vision first presented in 1985, wrote:

Revolutionary art must ... inspire a spirit of defiance, or class and national pride to resist domination and backward ideology. Revolutionary art must energize and humanize; not pacify, confuse and desensitize...

I am adamantly against one-dimensional, so called "correct" proscriptive forms that petty bourgeois critics try to label as "political art." I'm also not in favor of the errors of socialist-realist art with its glorified "socialist heroes", but favor imaginative critical realism, a sensuous rendering of the colorful material world. Art can fill us with love, with hope and with revolutionary vision.

Ultimately society must be transformed through the organization of people for socialist revolution. Artists can contribute a critique of capitalist society. This is critical realism: to criticize appearances and obscured social relations ... Artists play key roles in affecting consciousness and can help to transform the working class from a class-in-itself to a class-for-itself.

On August 4, 2006, Ho was diagnosed with colon cancer. After chemotherapy, his health improved, but a second tumor was found on September 24, 2007. He wrote two books about cancer: Diary of a Radical Cancer Warrior: Fighting Cancer and Capitalism at the Cellular Level (2011), and Raw Extreme Manifesto: Change Your Body, Change Your Mind and Change the World While Spending Almost Nothing! (2012). He received numerous grants, including from the National Endowment for the Arts and the Rockefeller Foundation, and among the honours accorded him were a 1996 American Book Award, a Guggenheim Fellowship, in 2009 the Harvard Arts Medal, and in March 2014 (almost a month before his death) the Harlem Arts Festival Lynette Velasco Community Impact Award. At the 17th Annual Black Musicians Conference, Ho became the youngest recipient of the Duke Ellington Distinguished Artist Lifetime Achievement Award. Ho died on April 12, 2014, aged 56, at his home in Brooklyn, New York.

== Discography ==
- 1985: Tomorrow is Now (Soul Note)
- 1985: Bamboo That Snaps Back (Finnadar)
- 1987: We Refuse to be Used and Abused (Soul Note)
- 1988: A Song for Manong (Asian Improv)
- 1993: The Underground Railroad to My Heart (Soul Note)
- 1996: Monkey Part I (Koch Jazz)
- 1997: Monkey Part II (Koch Jazz)
- 1997: Turn Pain Into Power (O.O. Discs)
- 1998: Yes Means Yes, No Means No, Whatever She Wears, Wherever She Goes (Koch)
- 1999: Warrior Sisters (Koch)
- 2001: Once Upon a Time in Chinese America (Innova)
- 2009: Celestial Green Monster (Mutable Music)
- 2011: Year of the Tiger (Innova)
- 2011: Snake-Eaters (Big Red Media)
- 2011: The Sweet Science Suite: A Scientific Soul Music Honoring of Muhammad Ali (Big Red Media)

With the Julius Hemphill Sextet

- Five Chord Stud (Black Saint, 1994)

== Books by Ho ==
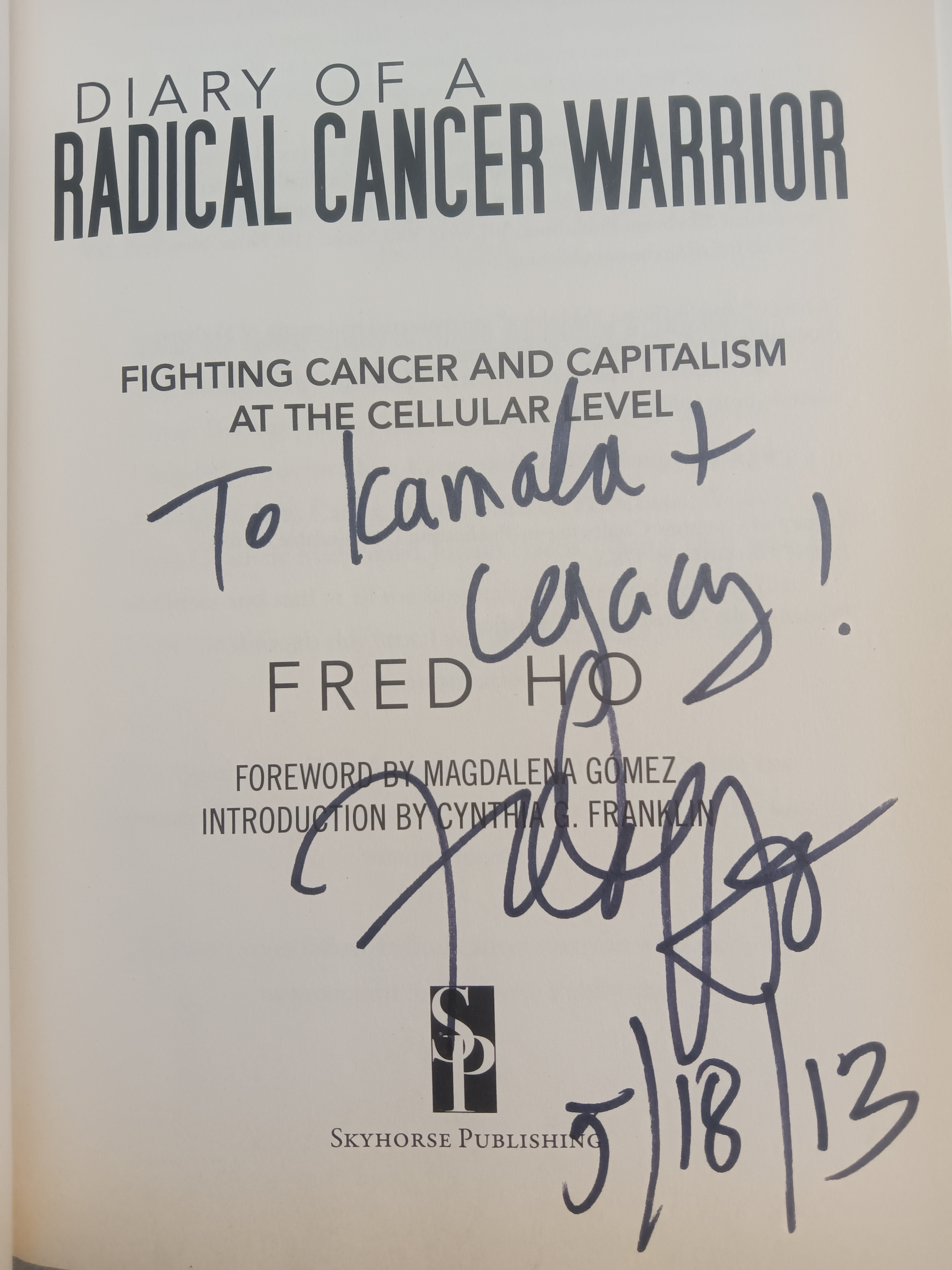
Diary of a Radical Cancer Warrior, title page signed by Ho in 2013

=== As author ===
- Ho, Fred Wei-han. Wicked Theory, Naked Practice: A Fred Ho Reader. United States, University of Minnesota Press, 2009.
- Ho, Fred. Diary of a Radical Cancer Warrior, Skyhorse Publishing, New York, 2011.
- Ho, Fred, and Lew, Peter. Raw Extreme Manifesto: Change Your Body, Change Your Mind, Change the World While Spending Almost Nothing!. United Kingdom, Skyhorse Publishing, 2012.

=== As editor ===
- Sakolsky, Ron, and Fred Ho. Sounding Off! Music as Subversion/Resistance/Revolution. Brooklyn, NY: Autonomedia, 1996.
- Ho, Fred. Legacy to Liberation: Politics and Culture of Revolutionary Asian Pacific America. Oakland, CA: AK Press, 2001.
- Ho, Fred and Bill V. Mullen. Afro Asia: Revolutionary Political and Cultural Connections between African Americans and Asian Americans. Durham, NC: Duke University Press, 2008.
- Shoatz, Russell Maroon (2013). Maroon the Implacable: The Collected Writings of Russell Maroon Shoatz. Fred Ho, Quincy Saul (eds.). Chicago: PM Press. ISBN 9781604860597.
