= Affluent society =

Form of society

An affluent society is form of society characterized by material abundance for broad segments of the population.

A typical image for the affluent society is the literary topos of the Cockaigne, a mythical land of luxury goods. Similar terms, used more in a negative context, are throw-away society and consumer society.

== History of the term ==
A popular description of the land of Cockaigne is found in 14th century Ireland as the eponymous poem The Land of Cokaygne, which was a fictional country located to the west of Spain.

The concept of the affluent society was borrowed from an economic work by the U.S. economist John Kenneth Galbraith called The Affluent Society and appears only sporadically in sociological or socio-critical works.

== Poverty in affluent societies ==
Open poverty in the U.S. entered the public consciousness in 1962 with the book by the left-wing Catholic Michael Harrington The Other America. He found 50 million poor people in a country of then 200 million inhabitants, who had also escaped social science because it had assumed that they simply could not exist.

With the strengthening of the civil rights movement and the slogan of the Great Society under President Lyndon B. Johnson, this previously overlooked aspect of U.S. society finally entered the consciousness of politicians.

For example, Gabriel Kolko's thorough study of income and wealth distribution over several decades found a stable persistence of poverty, and even rather a tendency for the poorer class to grow. Accordingly, Kolko considers the thesis of a middle-class society to be empirically refuted. The work of Simon Smith Kuznets had often served as the basis for the latter thesis. This study, however, was limited to the 5 percent of the population with the highest per capita income.

A more recent study also finds that poverty is a complex phenomenon whose trends and boundaries shift over time, both in absolute terms and in relative terms, but for which causes are very difficult to pin down. In principle, however, it should be clear that a solution to the social problem cannot be expected through market processes alone.

Critics of the affluent society, such as the Indian Germanist Saral Sarkar, see economism (dominance of the economy) as the basis for the processes of the affluent society. Sarkar calls for refusal to consume as a countermeasure.

== Literature ==
- John Kenneth Galbraith: The Affluent Society, 1958.
- Saral Sarkar: Ecosocialism or ecocapitalism? A critical analysis of humanity's fundamental choices, Zed Books, London/New York, 1999.

== See also ==
- Post-scarcity economy
