= Saral Sarkar =

Indian-German academic (born 1936)

Saral Sarkar সরল সরকার (Bengali)
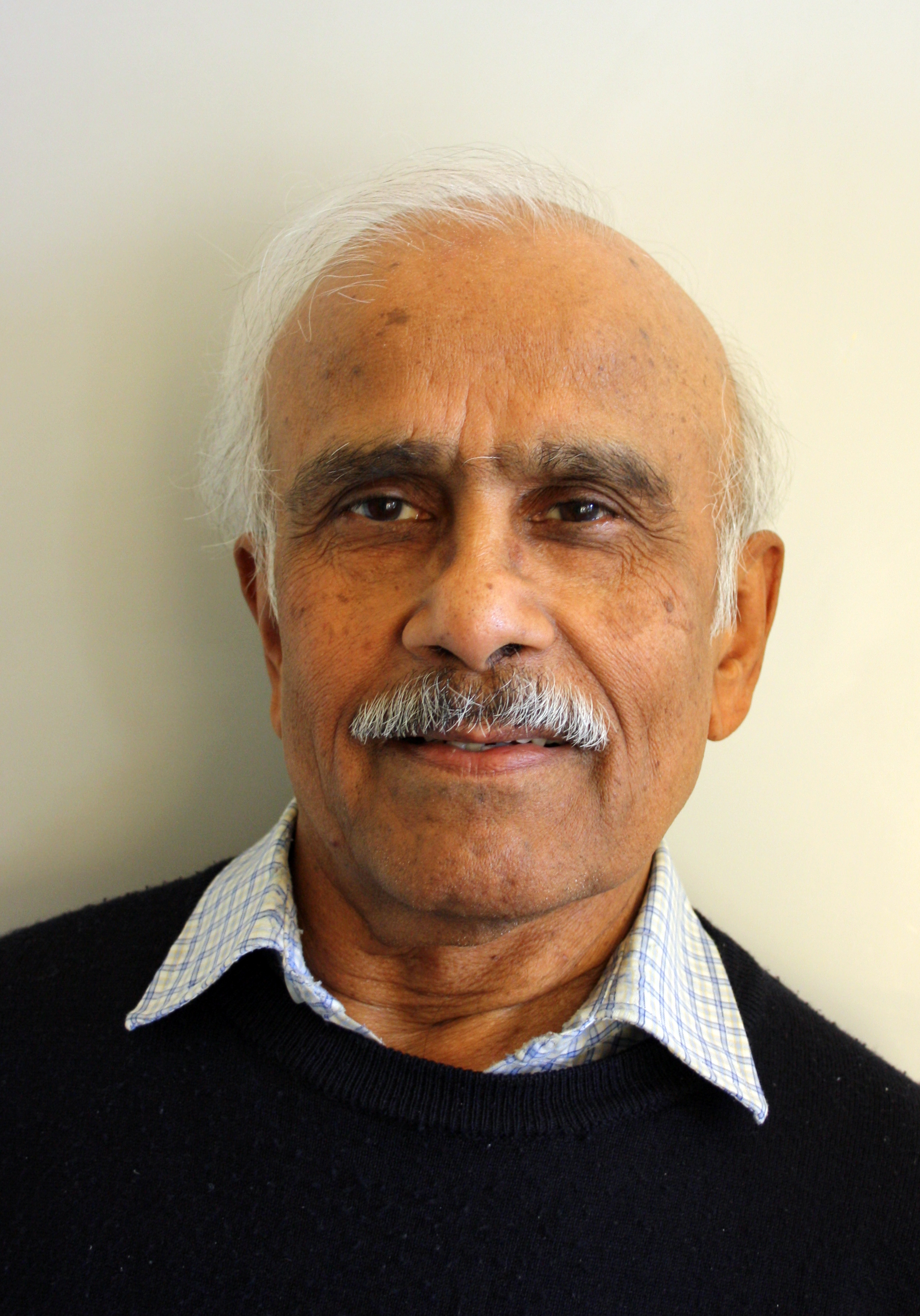
- Sarkar in 2010
- Born: 10 May 1936 (age 90); Kalimpong, Province of Bengal, British India (now West Bengal, India)
- Occupations: Writer, Academic, Activist
- Spouse: Maria Mies (m. 1976; died in 2023)
- Writing career
- Language: German, English
- Notable work: Eco-Socialism or Eco-Capitalism? – A Critical Analysis of Humanity's Fundamental Choices

Saral Sarkar (Bengali সরল সরকার), born 10 May 1936 in West Bengal, is an Indian-German academic and eco-socialist in a Third Way sense political activist. Sarkar taught at the Goethe Institute in Hyderabad from 1966 to 1981, as a lecturer in German. Since 1982, Sarkar has been based in Cologne, and has been a prominent figure in the European ecology and peace movement. Sarkar was also the secretary of the local Green Party of Cologne. In the 1980s, The United Nations University commissioned Sarkar to conduct an authoritative study of the Green movement in West Germany. His resultant two-volume study, Green-Alternative Politics in Federal Republic of Germany was published in 1993. Sarkar was prominent in the anti-globalization movement from 1997 to 2005 and in active in political debate. Sarkar's writings, in both English and German have been widely disseminated in numerous journals and his works have been published in English, Chinese, French and German.

== Personal life ==
From 1976, Sarkar was married to the sociologist Maria Mies, until her death in 2023.
