= Promedia Verlag =

Austrian publishing house

Promedia Verlag is an Austrian publishing house established in 1983. Founded to publish "books against the grain", particularly in the field of cultural history, it has since expanded to cover politics, history and travel books. Its "Edition Spuren" brand focuses on alternative or neglected histories of Austria (such as the role of women in the resistance to the 1938 Anschluss), while the "Brennpunkt Osteuropa" series focuses on the politics and history of eastern Europe. Published authors include Erich Fried, Johan Galtung, Alain Lipietz, Konrad P Liessmann, Edgar Morin, Immanuel Wallerstein, Susanne Weigelin-Schwiedrzik, and Alan Woods.
