= Maria Mies =

German professor of sociology and author (1931–2023)

- Born: 6 February 1931; Hillesheim, Rhine Province, Prussia, Germany
- Died: 15 May 2023 (aged 92)
- Education: University of Cologne (PhD)
- Occupations: Professor of sociology; Writer
- Employer(s): Goethe Institute (1963–1967); Cologne University of Applied Sciences (1972–1974; 1981–1993); University of Frankfurt Institute for Social Research (1974–1977); International Institute of Social Studies (1979–1981)
- Organisation(s): Frauenforum Köln, Attac
- Notable work: Indian Women and Patriarchy (1980); Patriarchy and Accumulation on a World Scale (1986); Women: The Last Colony (1988); Ecofeminism (1993); The Subsistence Perspective (1999)
- Spouse: Saral Sarkar (m. 1976)

Maria Mies (German: [miːs]; 6 February 1931 – 15 May 2023) was a German professor of sociology, a Marxist feminist, an activist for women's rights, and an author. She came from a rural background in the Volcanic Eifel, and initially trained to be a teacher. After working for several years as a primary school teacher and qualifying as a high school instructor, she applied to the Goethe Institute, hoping to work in Africa or Asia. Assigned to a school in Pune, India, she discovered that while her male students took German courses to further their education, women for the most part took her classes to avoid marriage. Returning to study at the University of Cologne, she prepared her dissertation about contradictions of social expectations for women in India in 1971, earning her PhD the following year.

Mies was active in social movements from the late 1960s. Her activism was in favour of women's liberation and pacifism and against the Vietnam War and nuclear armaments. She taught sociology at the Cologne University of Applied Sciences and University of Frankfurt Institute for Social Research in the 1970s. Becoming aware of the lack of knowledge about women's history, she helped found and then gave lectures at the first women's shelter in Germany. In 1979, she began teaching women's studies at the International Institute of Social Studies in The Hague and founded a master's degree programme for women from developing countries, based on feminist theory.

Returning to Germany and the University of Applied Sciences in 1981, Mies became involved in the ecofeminist movement and in activism against genetic engineering and reproductive technology. She coined the phrase "housewifisation" for the processes that devalue women's labour and make it invisible. From the 1980s, she wrote extensively about the intersection between capitalism, patriarchy and colonialism. Mies was one of the first scholars to recognise the similarities between the socio-politico-economic positions held by women and colonised people. Her works theorised that women and colonised people's labour was devalued and exploited under capitalism, and studied the links between women's struggles for liberation and their broader struggles for social and environmental justice. One of her main concerns was the development of an alternative, feminist and decolonial approach in methodology and in economics. Her work, which included writing textbooks on the history of women's movements, has garnered international analysis and been translated into several languages.

== Early life and education ==
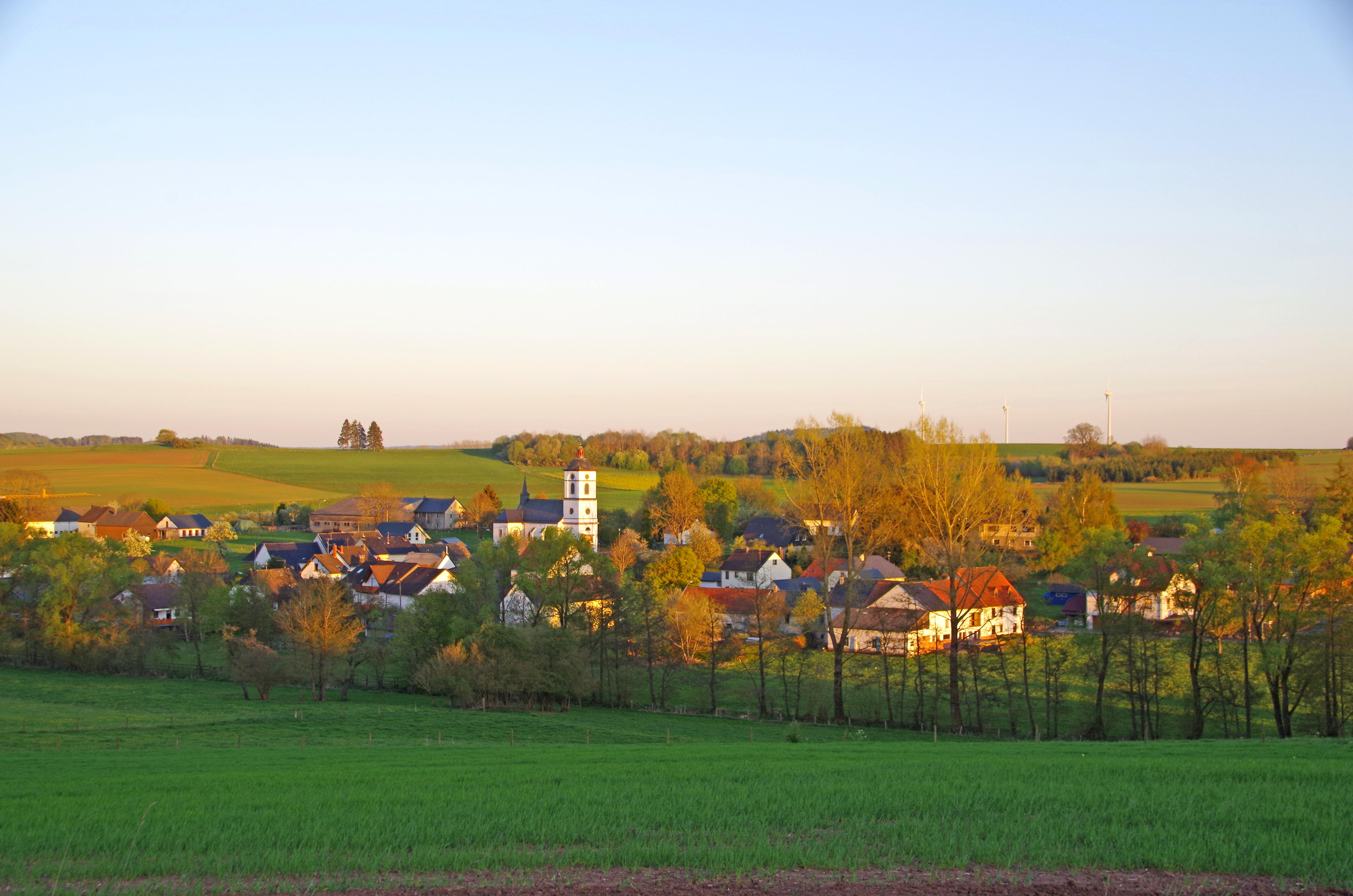
Auel, Germany

Mies was born in Hillesheim, Germany, on 6 February 1931 to Johann and Gertrud Mies. She came from a rural background, growing up in a family of farmers in Auel, a village in the Vulkaneifel region of the Prussian Rhine Province (now in Rhineland-Palatinate). She was the seventh of twelve children, who all worked in the fields while they were pupils at the local school with only one classroom. Her mother's temperament was optimistic, but her father was a patriarchal figure and caused fear for the family members with his anger. They were raised as Catholic. She was the first student from her village to complete secondary school, which she attended in Gerolstein, while boarding with a family friend. She then started at the Regino-Gymnasium in Prüm, but the school was closed in September 1944 because of the war.

From 1947, she trained in Trier where she earned her abitur and then enrolled at the Pedagogical Academy in Koblenz to become a primary school teacher. In order to attend courses free of charge, she had to agree to teach for five years. After two years of study, she was assigned to primary schools in Auel and later in Worms. In 1950, Mies met a Pakistani Muslim tourist who was travelling in Germany. Zulfiquar would have a profound influence on her life, as their relationship developed into a romance. Rejecting his proposal of marriage on the basis of their incompatible religions, led her to serious study of religious doctrines and patriarchy. She chose to remain single for many years in order to maintain her independence. In 1955, she asked for a new placement and was sent to Trier, where she taught and also studied English. Mies passed her secondary teacher's examination in 1962 and was assigned to teach English and German in Morbach. Unwilling to be a secondary school teacher, she applied to the Goethe Institute and asked for a placement in Asia or the Middle East.

== Career and activism ==
=== 1963–1977 ===
In 1963, Mies was accepted by the Goethe Institute to lecture in Pune, India, on a five-year teaching engagement. She taught German classes and discovered that while her male students enrolled to enhance their ability to study engineering, the majority of women took her courses to prolong their independence, as middle-class women were not required to marry until they had completed a bachelor's degree. One of her students, Chhaya Datar, later became head of the women's studies department at the Tata Institute of Social Sciences. Another, Saral Sarkar, later became her husband. In 1967, her mother became gravely ill and Mies asked to be released early from her contract. Soon after her return to Germany her mother made a full recovery, and Mies enrolled at the University of Cologne to study sociology under René König. Using her observations during her time in India about women's behaviour and the contradictions of social expectations for women, she prepared her PhD thesis Rollenkonflikte gebildeter indischer Frauen (Role Conflicts of Educated Indian Women) in 1971. She earned her doctorate in 1972, and her thesis was published the following year.

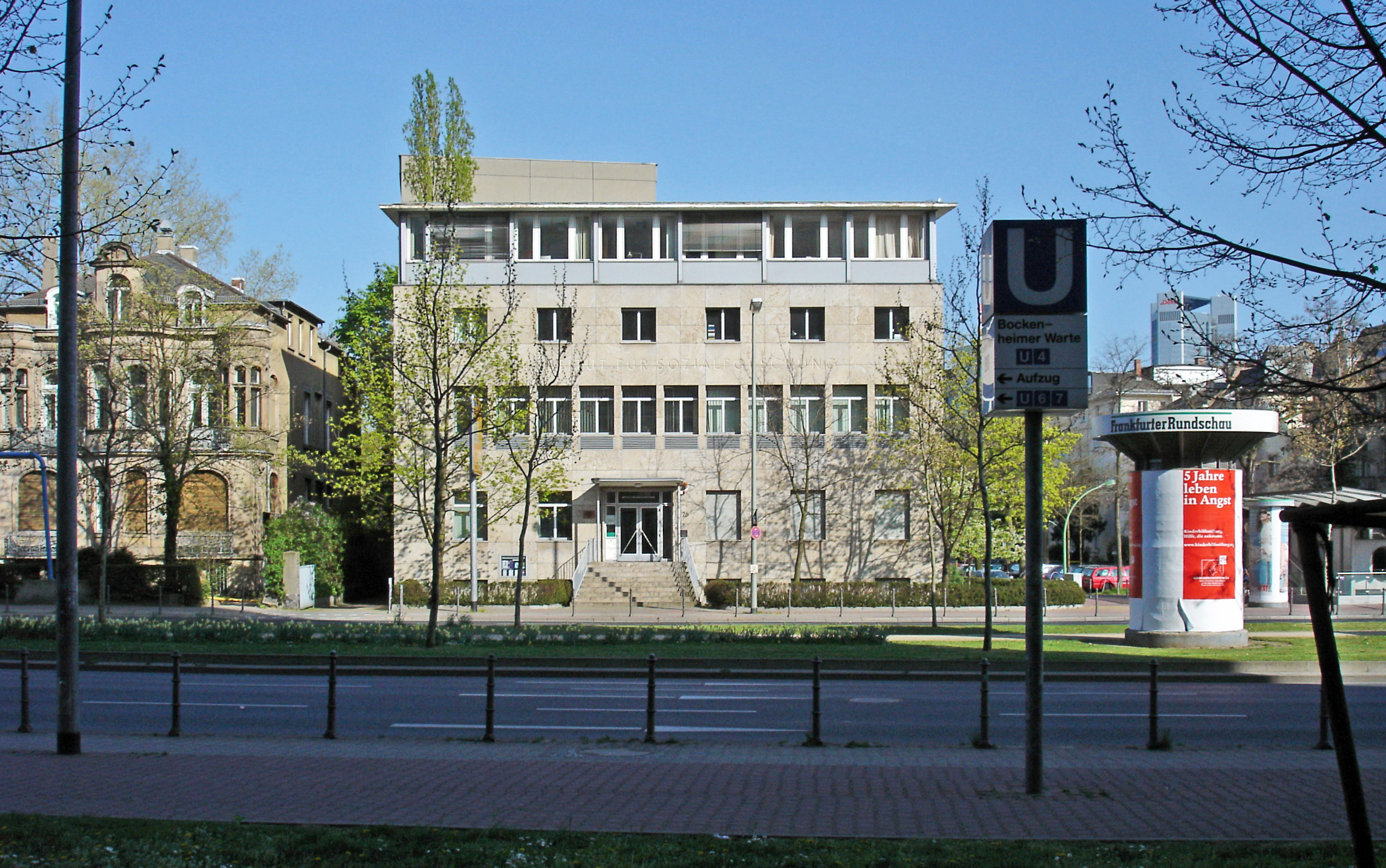
University of Frankfurt Institute for Social Research

The late 1960s and early 1970s was a period of global protest and Mies became involved in activism. She participated in protests against the Vietnam War and nuclear armaments in the annual pacifist Easter March. She joined Frauenforum Köln (Women's Forum Cologne), a local women's group tied to the women's liberation movement, which protested patriarchal structures and the devaluation of women. She participated in the Politische Nachtgebete (political night-prayers), organised by Dorothee Sölle, which were aimed at questioning the status of women in the church. As she became more involved in protest and women's lack of equality, Mies became critical of religion and left the Catholic church. She taught at the newly founded Cologne University of Applied Sciences, before accepting a post in 1974 to teach at the University of Frankfurt Institute for Social Research. For three years, she presented seminars on the historic international women's movement, hoping she could convince the university to establish a women's study chair. In 1975, she attended the World Conference on Women in Mexico City and realised how little was known about women's history. In 1976, she married Sarkar, with the intent of having a visiting marriage allowing each to continue their careers in their respective countries. That year, she joined with other activists, mainly students of her classes, to found the women's shelter (Frauenhaus) in Cologne, one of the first of its kind in Germany. Mies lectured at the shelter, teaching women practical and political ways to combat violence. She returned to the University of Applied Sciences in 1977, but decided to conduct a research project in India the following year.

=== 1978–2001 ===
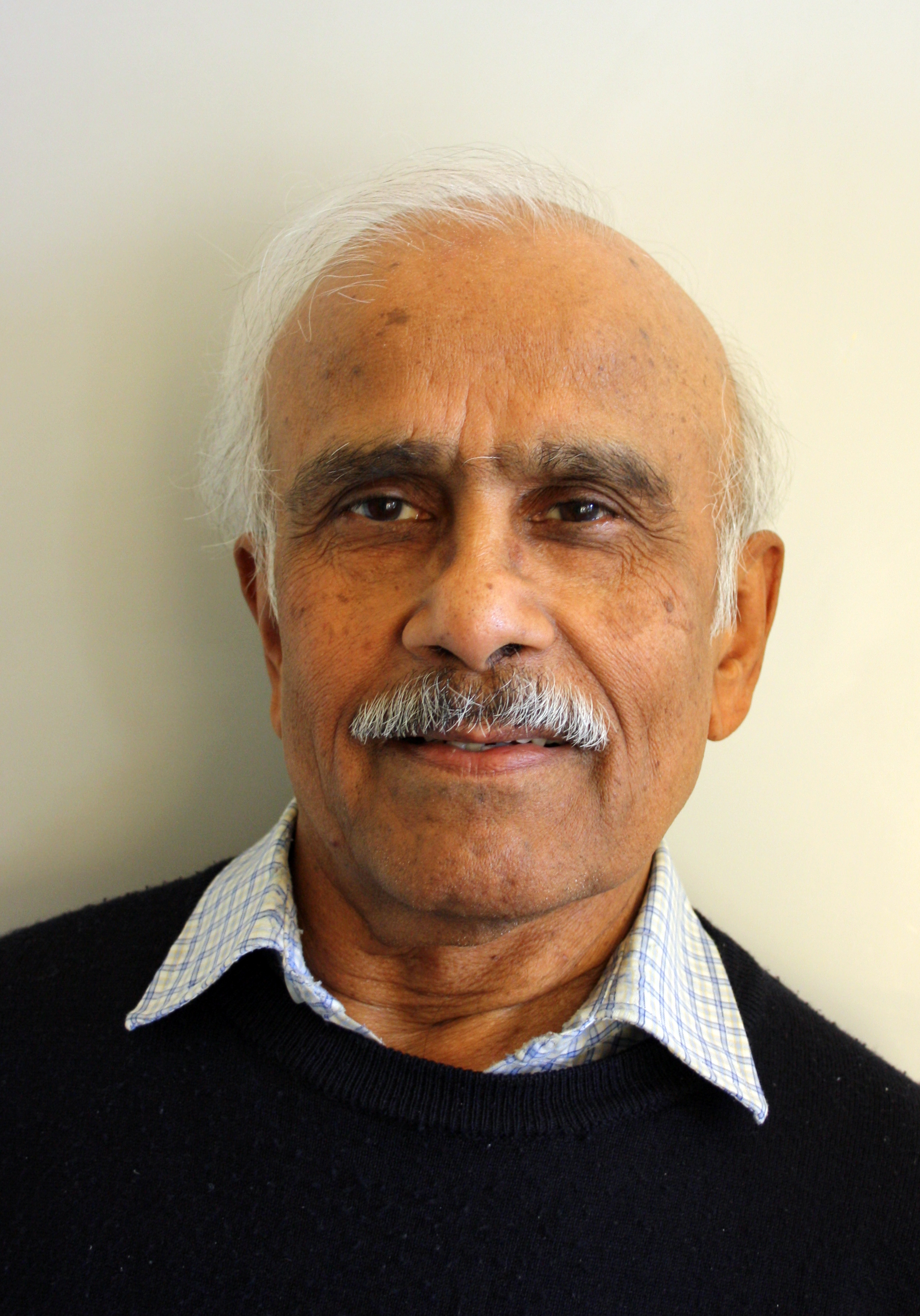
Saral Sarkar, 2010

Mies arrived in India in 1978 to analyze rural subsistence production, meaning how domestic and farm labour, as well as cottage industry, allowed families to survive, but also led to the expansion of wealth for landlords and industries. She remained in India to the end of 1979 and spent time with her former pupil, Sarkar, who at the time was a lecturer at the Goethe Institute in Hyderabad. The results of her study of rural industry were published as The Lacemakers of Narsapur: Indian Housewives Produce for the World Market in 1982. She returned to Europe after accepting a position at the International Institute of Social Studies in The Hague. There, she created a master's degree programme for women from developing countries. To enable her students to complete the practical requirements, Mies made contact with local feminist groups to develop joint projects they could carry out. The administration decided not to renew the "Women and Development" programme for the next semester but Mies and her students successfully protested and the course continued to be offered. Because no textbooks at that time existed on the history of women's movements, particularly for the Global South, Mies and Kumari Jayawardena, a political scientist at the University of Colombo, wrote a series of texts for their students to use. Launching an international research project, she worked with scholars Mia Berden, Rhoda Reddock, and Saskia Wieringa to create a historiography of women's movements for Africa, Asia, the Caribbean, and Latin America with help from academics and activists from those countries.

The programme was based on ideas she had first developed about women's studies and feminist scholarship in a 1977 paper "Towards a Methodology for Feminist Research" delivered at a conference in Frankfurt. To combat what she saw as a disconnect between theory and practical application in the academic setting, Mies aimed to rewrite existing teaching methods. She did not believe that feminist research could use existing research models and proposed instead seven steps to completely re-imagine research with usefulness and respect for the subject in mind. These steps included a rejection of both quantitative methods and extrapolation of studies on men to apply to women's experiences. She argued that research should be participatory, meaning that the researcher and the subject should collaborate in the processes and goals of the study, which should aim at empowering women and dismantling patriarchal systems. The paper was later published as a chapter of the book Theories of Women's Studies (1983), and praised for its methodological innovations and theoretical advancements. Scholar Nancy Barnes, stated that Mies's article was so compelling that "it alone makes the book worth buying", but noted that the chapter did not resolve the question of whether women's studies should be a stand-alone field, or integrated into other fields.

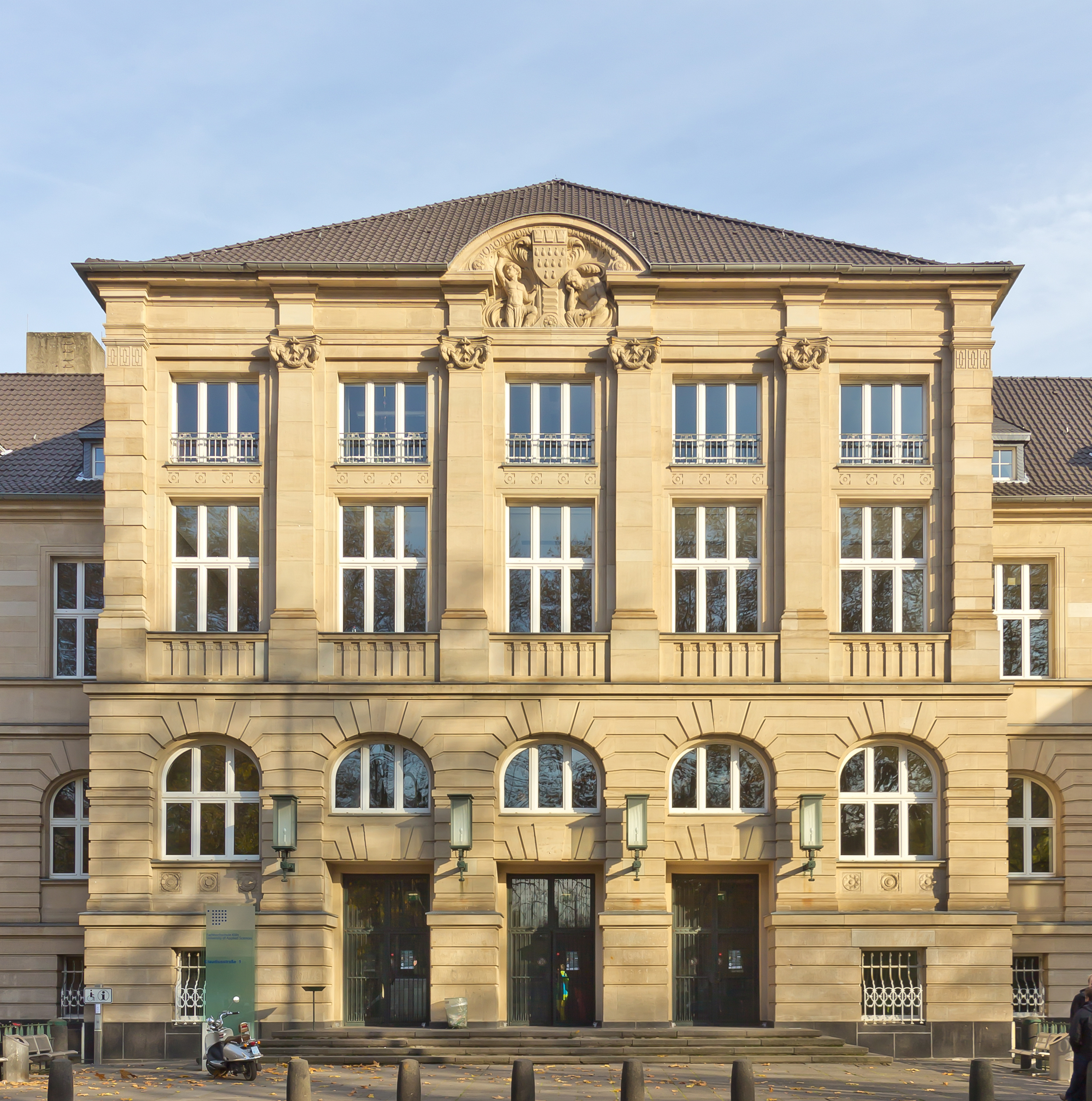
Cologne University of Applied Sciences

In 1981, Mies decided to return to Cologne and the University of Applied Sciences and Sarkar, her husband, joined her there permanently in 1982. She became involved in the ecofeminist movement, as well as in activism against genetic engineering and reproductive technology, which she saw as an expropriation of a woman's right to give birth and a commercialization of human production. She was one of the founders of the Feminist International Network of Resistance to Reproductive and Genetic Engineering. Within this organization and in her works, she argued that women from the Global North were urged to use invasive technologies such as assisted fertilisation and surrogacy to increase their child-bearing, while women in the Global South were pressed to limit births to control population growth. Mies also pointed out that to exercise decisions about their bodies, women are limited by systems designed, controlled, and administered by health providers and government officials. She became more active in pacifist activities, participating in a resistance camp protesting against a NATO plan to station nuclear warheads in Germany in 1983. Her pacifism was reinforced by her opposition to the idea put forth by Alice Schwarzer that women could gain emancipation if they had the same violent means which were available to men. Opposed to war, Mies could not reconcile that simple equality with men would overcome hierarchical systems that devalued women. Having retired from teaching in 1993, she continued to be active in women's and other social movements. She was a founding member of Attac, formed in 1999, and organised feministAttac, in 2001 at the association's congress, held that year in Berlin.

== Scholarly contributions ==
Mies's earliest works such as Indian Women in Patriarchy (1980) and The Lace Makers of Narsapur (1982), which evaluated her years in India, as well as later works like "Sexist and Racist Implications of New Reproductive Technology" (Alternatives, 1987) critiqued policies aimed at maintaining an uneven, stratified societal structure which encouraged domination and exploitation. She sought to evaluate how women's labour became hidden and how the perception that women were reliant upon a husband's income emerged. She theorised that by eliminating pay for the work women performed, making them available at all times for labour, alienating them from society by keeping them in the home, giving them no job security, and eliminating their ability to contract or unionise, women lost agency. She named the process which prevented women from being seen as producers or self-employed individuals and resulted in their exploitation, "housewifisation". The anthropologist Danielle Léveillé characterised Mies's works as both "masterful" and "astonishing" in that she was able to link variables from the anti-colonial, anti-racist, ecology, feminist, and non-violence movements to critique policies that established power relationships in society.

Political scientist Elisabeth Prügl pointed to Mies's connection of the threads in society that united women, colonised people, and nature as being free for exploitation. The unpaid labour of the former was easily equated to the free availability of air and water. Prügl tested Mies's theory that housewives were superexploited and confirmed that they were. Using data from the International Labour Organization, she found that housewives universally earned less than the legal minimum wage. In looking at homemakers in Brazil, Britain, Pakistan, Thailand, and Turkey, Prügl confirmed that housewives were typically viewed as non-workers. However, she found that there was not a universal acceptance by women, or their various societies, of the cultural and political meaning of housewifery and its value. She concluded that because of the "multiple contextual meanings" of the term housewife, exploitation more likely resulted from the political, rather than economic, spread of capitalism. Prügl questioned whether housewifisation as an underpinning of capitalism failed to evaluate whether exploitation was instead related to global patriarchy.

From the mid-1980s, Mies published her most important works which explored the links between patriarchy, capitalism and colonialism in the exploitation and subjugation of women. In the book Patriarchy and Accumulation on a World Scale Women in the International Division of Labour (1986), Mies evaluated the development of feminism, the sexual division of labour, and how violence shaped politics in Africa, Asia, and Latin America. In her analysis, the process of "housewifisation" was based on the Western ideals of capital accumulation. In other words, by destroying women's autonomy and making them possessions, men were able to acquire productive capital and amass wealth. She saw family violence, not as a remnant of ancient society, but as a part of the processes to modernise. In the work, she found that socialist development had created similar social structures exploiting women and argued for creation of a utopian feminist society. In Mies's vision, the basis for labour would be usefulness rather than accumulation. She theorised that if consumers in overdeveloped places fulfilled their needs to sustain life from producers in underdeveloped countries, it would give worldwide relief from exploitation. Léveillé noted that while such a plan might work, its drawback was that it devalued things like music, flowers, and art, which while not essential or necessary to support human life provided therapeutic benefits.

Picking up themes of domination from Patriarchy and Accumulation, Mies's 1988 book Women: The Last Colony, written with social scientists Veronika Bennholdt-Thomsen and Claudia von Werlhof, brought colonised people into the analysis. They explained that just as women were rendered invisible, subjugated people were isolated from mainstream society and were treated as a natural resource to be exploited. Departing from a strict Marxist feminist argument, the central theme of the work was that the exploitation and oppression of women and colonised people were not secondary results caused by capitalism, but fundamental to creating the mechanisms of global production. Université de Montréal anthropology professor, Deirdre Meintel, noted that Mies argued that labour exploitation was a primary factor in developing both social classes and economic divisions. Meintel also said that Mies's chapter 7, "Class Struggles and Women's Struggles in India", was "worth the price of the book", as it told of the successful resistance by women in Andhra Pradesh, who aligned with male peasants' fight to protect their rights.

Ecofeminism (1993), written by Mies and scholar Vandana Shiva used a Marxist approach to evaluate climate change, loss of diversity, multi-systemic failures, and resistance. They evaluated how production systems and accumulation caused dispossession of land and culture, leading to problems such as world hunger. Mies and Shiva argued that women were linked internationally by their common experiences related to capitalist expansion. According to the environmental scholar Catriona Sandilands, unlike other ecofeminist works the book demonstrated that despite geographical differences and socio-economic variances "women's lives and bodies are being colonised" through capitalist mechanisms. Yet, Sandilands also said that gender was not the only factor involved in creating capitalist inequalities, and that a theory based on that single premise must be flawed. She said that given the diversity of women's experiences and cultural contexts, the claim that subsistence activities would solve global distribution problems might be utopian.

The book was updated and republished in 2014, concluding that the issues it had addressed were worsening instead of improving. It was also translated into Spanish in 2016. Evaluating the links between technology, science, and cultural development, scholars Jimena Andrieu and María Julia Eliosoff Ferrero, said that Mies and Shiva pointed out that globalisation led to a crisis which reduced human freedoms by commodifying and privatising everything to increase production and profits. Mies and Shiva argued that by placing nurturing of life and health as the focal point of economics, a balance between society, the economy, and the ecosystem would be restored. The re-issuance of the book sparked new debate on the roles of women in activist movements in the Global South. Andrieu and Eliosoff disagreed with the theory, saying that with large sectors of the population unemployed and living in poverty in the southern hemisphere, the turn toward subsistence and producing only goods that sustain life was questionable.

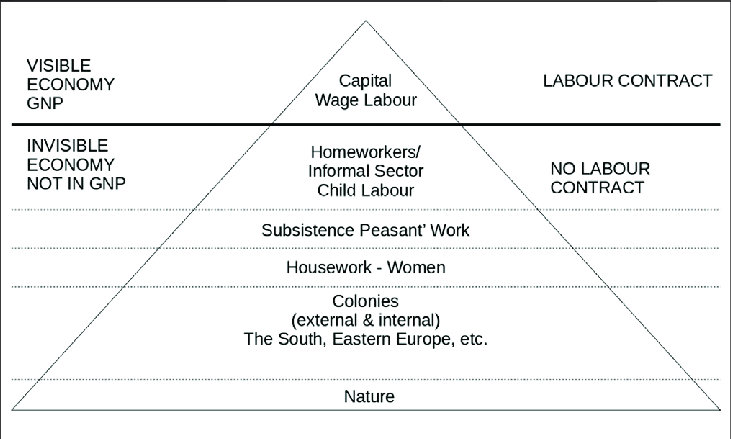
An illustration of the "iceberg model" from Mies and Bennholdt-Thomsen's 1999 book The Subsistence Perspective

In The Subsistence Perspective (1999), Mies and Bennholdt-Thomsen argued that subsistence production, the production of goods and services for personal or community use, has been devalued, hidden, and marginalised by capitalist systems. Using the "iceberg model", they noted that the only visible labour in a traditional capitalistic society is that of the formal labour force. Hidden below the surface, the base of the iceberg represents unpaid domestic work, caring, and informal labour, which includes various forms of untaxed labour such as micro-entrepreneurs, child labourers and family members who work for other family members, and non-permanent workers. They argued in favour of a society in which, instead of delegating labour-intensive work to certain segments of the population, communities shared all tasks. The sharing model would give each person a basic income, some security, and a measure of power in decision-making. The book was called an "excellent feminist source on political economy" by the sociologist Ariel Salleh of Western Sydney University.

== Later life, death, and legacy ==
Mies wrote an autobiography, Das Dorf und die Welt: Lebensgeschichten – Zeitgeschichten (The Village and the World: My Life, Our Times, 2008). In a review, feminist academic Renate Klein, who knew Mies for nearly three decades, wrote that it was an honest reflection of the failures and successes of Mies's life. Klein said that Mies's youth in a self-sufficient farming village gave her the practical skills to meet life's struggles and shaped her future works on subsistence theory. She called the autobiography "an important piece of contemporary and women's history", because it recalled how feminism – and the fight against discrimination, exploitation, and violence – had changed and grown over the period of Mies's life. In her later years, Mies lived in a care facility, and at the end of her life was unable to recognise her husband, who visited her daily. Mies died on 15 May 2023, at age 92.

Author Monika Mengel, stated that Mies is regarded as a pioneer of women's studies in Germany and Ireen Dubel, a policy expert on women's rights, stated that not only were her scholarly contributions pioneering, but they served as "inspiration for different generations of feminist scholars and activists. Her original concept of "housewifisation", introduced in Patriarchy and Accumulation but developed in her study of lacemakers in India, is widely used by academics. Mies was one of the first feminist scholars to analyze the similarities between the position of women and colonised people in socio-economic hierarchies. Her book Ecofeminism has had international impact, and has been translated into several languages, including Spanish and Turkish.

== Selected works ==
- Mies, Maria (1980). Indian Women and Patriarchy: Conflicts and Dilemmas of Students and Working Women. New Delhi: Concept Publishing Company. OCLC 7635521. (English translation of her thesis). – via Project MUSE (subscription required)
- ————— (1981). "The Social Origins of the Sexual Division of Labour". ISS Occasional Papers (85). Institute of Social Studies, The Hague, The Netherlands.
- ————— (1982). Lace Makers of Narsapur: Indian Housewives Produce for the World Market. London: Zed Books. ISBN 978-0-86232-032-4.
- ————— (1986). Patriarchy and Accumulation On A World Scale: Women in the International Division of Labour. London: Zed Books. ISBN 978-1-85649-735-0.
- —————; Bennholdt-Thomsen, Veronika; Werlhof, Claudia von (1988). Women: The Last Colony. London: Zed Books. ISBN 978-0-86232-455-1.
- —————; Shiva, Vandana (1993). Ecofeminism. London: Zed Books. ISBN 978-1-85649-156-3.
- ————— (1998). "Preface". In Sittirak, Sinith (ed.). The Daughters of Development: Women in a Changing Environment. London: Zed Books. pp. x–xv. ISBN 978-1-85649-588-2.
- —————; Bennholdt-Thomsen, Veronika (1999). The Subsistence Perspective: Beyond the Globalised Economy. London: Zed Books. ISBN 978-1-85649-776-3.
- ————— (2010). The Village and the World: My Life, Our Times. North Melbourne, Australia: Spinifex Press. ISBN 978-1-876756-82-6.
