= White Violet Center for Eco-Justice =

Coordinates: 39°30′42.1″N 87°27′35.2″W

- Abbreviation: WVC
- Formation: 1996
- Type: Ministry of the Sisters of Providence of Saint Mary-of-the-Woods, Indiana
- Legal status: Not for profit
- Location(s): Saint Mary-of-the-Woods, Indiana; United States
- Director: Lorrie Heber
- Website: WhiteViolet.org

White Violet Center for Eco-Justice is a non-profit eco-justice education center focusing on organic agriculture, spiritual ecology and social advocacy. Founded in 1996 by Sister of Providence Ann Sullivan, the center is a ministry of the Sisters of Providence of Saint Mary-of-the-Woods, Indiana. The center grew out of the Roman Catholic women's religious congregation's commitment to eco-spirituality and sustainability.

The center maintains a herd of alpacas, 343 acres (1.39 km^{2}) of state-certified organic farmland, bees, a berry patch, a farmers' market, classified forest and orchards. White Violet Center hosts field trips, workshops and film series to educate both children and adults. The center has hosted a variety of speakers including cosmologist Brian Swimme, beekeeper Günther Hauk, author Judy Cannato and essayist Scott Russel Sanders.

White Violet Center is considered an "engaged project" by the Yale Forum on Religion and Ecology. It is also featured in Sarah McFarland Taylor's 2007 book Green Sisters: A Spiritual Ecology.

== Philosophy ==
The White Violet Center mission statement states the center exists "to foster a way of living that recognizes the interdependence of all creation. Grounded in an understanding of Providence Spirituality as hope and healing, the center offers leadership and education in the preservation, restoration and reverent use of all natural resources."

As a congregation, the Sisters of Providence have practiced this mission by installing a biomass boiler to heat and power the buildings on their motherhouse grounds, producing biodiesel, maintaining a significant recycling program, and using sustainable irrigation systems for the organic gardens and orchards.

== Alpacas ==
=== Herd ===
White Violet Center's herd of alpacas operates under the name White Violet Farm Alpacas. The center acquired its first six animals as a donation in 1998. White Violet alpacas entered in shows have won numerous awards from associations including the Alpaca Owners and Breeders Association (AOBA).

The animals are named after significant figures in Sisters of Providence history. Alpacas with names like Providence Theodore Guerin (after congregation foundress Saint Mother Theodore Guerin), Providence Raphael (after former general superior Mary Raphael Slattery), and Providence Pere Michel (after an early gardener for the sisters) pay tribute to this past.

=== Fiber ===
All fiber from the herd is processed and utilized. Staff members and volunteers spin, knit and weave handmade products, and the center offers fiber workshops to teach these skills.
