= Glenys Livingstone =

Independent scholar and goddess practitioner

- Born: 21 March 1954 (age 72); Queensland
- Education: University of Western Sydney, Ph.D.
- Occupations: author, teacher
- Known for: Creator of PaGaian Cosmology, an earth-based goddess movement
- Website: PaGaian Cosmology

Glenys Livingstone (born 21 March 1954) is an Australian author and teacher who has made significant contributions to the feminist pagan community and is the creator of the earth-based goddess movement known as PaGaian Cosmology.

== Early life and education ==
Livingstone was born on 21 March 1954 and grew up in rural Queensland, Australia.

She completed an MA dissertation titled Motherhood Mythology at the Graduate Theological Union in Berkeley, California in 1981.

Livingstone went on to complete a PhD at the University of Western Sydney in 2002. The title of her thesis was The female metaphor – virgin, mother, crone of the dynamic cosmological unfolding: Her embodiment in seasonal ritual as a catalyst for personal and cultural change.

== Career ==
In 1980 Livingstone was a participant at Starhawk's first Reclaiming class in San Francisco and here she gained her first experience of pagan ritual practice. She has also named American cosmologist Brian Swimme and world religions scholar Thomas Berry as two of her teachers.

Although originally from a Christian church background, over time Livingstone moved towards an earth-based goddess approach. Part of this transition was documented in her contributions to the feminist theology journal Women-Church over its 20-year history. Titles of some of these contributions included: "Towards a Maternal Theology", "Notes on Leaving Christianity", "Re-Visioning Our Mythology: the Goddess and the God", and a reflection piece in the journal' s final issue titled, "Women-Church and the Advent of PaGaian Cosmology".

Livingstone is primarily known for her contribution to earth-based spirituality, which is part of the wider field of spiritual ecology. Livingstone describes it in her book, PaGaian Cosmology: Re-inventing Earth-Based Goddess Religion, as "an ecospirituality grounded in indigenous Western religious celebration of the Earth-Sun annual cycle."

Livingstone is a regular contributor to Naturalistic Paganism, a website "dedicated to amplifying the voices of and providing an online home for Naturalistic and Humanistic Pagans who seek to integrate ritual and meditative practices with a mythic worldview based on the most current and compelling scientific evidence". She also contributes to the Return to Mago eMagazine and has been a guest contributor on the Feminism and Religion website, which aims to explore "the F-word in religion and the intersection between scholarship, activism, and community".

In 2009 she co-presented her work of PaGaian Cosmology in two programs at the Parliament of World Religions in Melbourne in sessions titled Paganism in Australia: a Community Forum and The New Archaic: Neuroscience, Spiritual Practice and Healing.

In 2011 Livingstone was a guest on an ABC' s Radio National Encounter program titled Pagans Among Us. Her interview was featured in a later radio program about contemporary paganism in 2022.

Livingstone has published widely in her areas of expertise, contributing chapters to many edited volumes related to the earth-based goddess movement. In 2015 Livingstone contributed to a volume about the women' s spirituality movement, told through the individual stories of the founders. Titled Foremothers of the women's spirituality movement: elders and visionaries, the volume was edited by Miriam Robbins Dexter and American feminist shamanic healer Vicki Noble.

== Reviews of Livingstone's work ==
Anthropologist Lynne Hume, who reviewed PaGaian Cosmology noted that, "Its acknowledgment of subtle shifts in everyday life through observation of the environment and the seasons will help people understand the growing interest in Paganism in today' s world from the perspective of an academic and experienced pagan practitioner whose focus is on the feminine and nature.

== Select publications ==
=== Books and book chapters ===
- Livingstone, Glenys (2016). My name is Medusa : a girl god publication. Arna Baartz. United States. ISBN 978-1-5309-2289-5. OCLC 957325462.
- Livingstone, Glenys (2015). "Conceiving and nurturing a poiesis of Her". In Dexter, Miriam Robbins; Noble, Vicki (eds.). Foremothers of the women's spirituality movement : elders and visionaries. Amherst, New York. ISBN 978-1-934844-50-2. OCLC 930709884.
- Livingstone, Glenys (2005). PaGaian cosmology : re-inventing earth-based goddess religion. New York: iUniverse. ISBN 0-595-34990-0. OCLC 122343205.

=== Edited books ===
- Livingstone, G and T. Hendren. (eds) (2017) Re-visioning medusa: from monster to divine wisdom. CreateSpace Independent Publishing Platform. ISBN 9781544179650

=== Journal articles ===
- Livingstone, G. (2019) “From the Magic of Togaianess: Ngapartji-Ngapartji in Indigenous Australia,” Canadian Woman Studies, 34(1-2), p. 19.
- Livingstone, G. (2007) "Women-Church and the Advent of PaGaian Cosmology", Women-Church: an Australian Journal of Feminist Studies in Religion, 40: p. 140.
