= Earth jurisprudence =

Philosophy of law

Earth jurisprudence is a philosophy of law and human governance that is based on the fact that humans are only one part of a wider community of beings and that the welfare of each member of that community is dependent on the welfare of the Earth as a whole. It states that human societies will only be viable and flourish if they regulate themselves as part of this wider Earth community and do so in a way that is consistent with the fundamental laws or principles that govern how the universe functions, which is the 'Great Jurisprudence'.

Earth jurisprudence can be differentiated from the Great jurisprudence, but can also be understood as being embedded within it. Earth jurisprudence can be seen as a special case of the Great Jurisprudence, applying universal principles to the governmental, societal and biological processes of Earth.

Earth jurisprudence seeks to expand our understanding of the relevance of governance beyond humanity to the whole Earth community, it is Earth-centric rather than anthropocentric. It is concerned with the maintenance and regulation of relations between all members of the Earth community, not just between human beings. Earth jurisprudence is intended to provide a philosophical basis for the development and implementation of human governance systems, which may include ethics, laws, institutions, policies and practices. It also places an emphasis on the internalisation of these insights and on personal practice, in living in accordance with Earth jurisprudence as a way of life.

Earth jurisprudence should reflect a particular human community's understanding of how to regulate itself as part of the Earth community and should express the qualities of the Great jurisprudence of which it forms part. The specific applications of Earth jurisprudence will vary from society to society, while sharing common elements. These elements include:

- a recognition that any Earth jurisprudence exists within a wider context that shapes it and influences how it functions;
- a recognition that the universe is the source of the fundamental 'Earth rights' of all members of the Earth community, rather than some part of the human governance system and accordingly these rights cannot be validly circumscribed or abrogated by human jurisprudence;
- a means of recognising the roles and 'rights' of non-human members of the Earth community and of restraining humans from unjustifiably preventing them fulfilling those roles;
- a concern for reciprocity and the maintenance of a dynamic equilibrium between all the members of the Earth community determined by what is best for the system as a whole (Earth justice); and
- an approach to condoning or disapproving human conduct on the basis of whether or not the conduct strengthens or weakens the bonds that constitute the Earth community.

== History ==
The need for a new jurisprudence was first identified by Thomas Berry who identified the destructive anthropocentrism on which existing legal and political structures are based as a major impediment to the necessary transition to an ecological age in which humans would seek a new intimacy with the integral functioning of the natural world.

The feasibility of developing this jurisprudence (by then provisionally referred to as 'Earth jurisprudence') was discussed at meeting attended by Berry in April 2001, organised by the Gaia Foundation in London at the Airlie Conference Center outside Washington. A group of people involved in the law and with indigenous peoples came together from South Africa, Britain, Colombia, Canada and the United States.

The first detailed exploration of Earth jurisprudence in print and the introduction of the term 'Great Jurisprudence' occurred with the first publication of Wild Law by Cormac Cullinan, launched at the World Summit for Sustainable Development in Cape Town 2002.

=== 2004 workshop ===
April 2004, first UK workshop held to discuss and develop the principles of Earth jurisprudence, titled 'Wild Law Wilderness Workshop: A Walking Workshop on Earth Jurisprudence'. Donald Reid (former chairman of UKELA, the UK Environmental Law Association) and Cormac Cullinan (author of Wild Law) lead the workshop in the Knoydart Peninsula (one of the last true wilderness areas in the Scotland).

The feasibility of developing a new form of jurisprudence was discussed at a conference in Washington attended by Thomas Berry in April 2001, organised by the Gaia Foundation. A group of people involved with law and indigenous peoples attended from South Africa, Britain, Colombia, Canada and the United States.

In 2006 the first Center for Earth Jurisprudence established in Florida. The mission of the Centre, which is co-sponsored by Barry and St. Thomas Universities, Florida, is to re-envision law and governance in ways that support the well being of the Earth community as a whole. This involves fostering mutually enhancing relationships among humans and nature and recognition of the rights of nature.

An earth jurisprudence UK conference, 'A Walk on the Wild Side: Changing Environmental Law', was held in November. Another earth jurisprudence meeting, a talk and discussion on 'Law and Governance from an Earth-Centred Perspective', was also held in November.

=== 2007 events ===
"Earth Jurisprudence: Defining the Field and Claiming the Promise", a three-day colloquium on the principles and implications of the emerging field of Earth Jurisprudence. Cormac Cullinan of EnAct International, South Africa, Thomas Linzey and Richard Grossman both of Community Environmental Legal Defense Fund, Pennsylvania, and Liz Hosken of Gaia Foundation, London, are amongst the speakers at the new Centre for Earth Jurisprudence in Florida, USA, April 2007.

UK conference and workshop, September 2007, entitled, "A 'Wild Law' Response to Climate Change". A participatory event to develop a practical approach for applying Wild Law principles which are already helping shift legal processes in the US and South Africa. Organised by UK Environmental Law Association, in partnership with the Environmental Law Foundation and the Gaia Foundation, with funding from the Body Shop Foundation. Internationally renowned speakers will include Andrew Kimbrell, Executive Director of the Center for Food Safety, Pennsylvania, who helped win a Supreme Court case in the US on climate change; Cormac Cullinan, the South African lawyer and author of Wild Law; and Peter Roderick, Director of the Climate Justice Programme UK, a barrister with twenty years' experience in private practise, the oil industry, academia and the public interest environmental sector, and was Friends of the Earth's lawyer in London from 1996. Held at a conference centre in Derbyshire, UK.

References: UKELA next events.

An Earth Jurisprudence conference held in the US in February 2008, in collaboration with the new Center for Earth Jurisprudence, and with students from Barry University Law School and St. Thomas University Law School.

Australia has a very active Earth jurisprudence and 'wild law' movement. The first wild law conference in Australia was held in Adelaide, South Australia in 2009 and a second conference was held in Wollongong, New South Wales, in 2010. A third Wild Law conference was organised in 2011 in Brisbane, Queensland and at that time a core group of Earth jurisprudence advocates formed the Australian Earth Laws Alliance.

== Classes being taught in law schools ==
Barry University School of Law initiated a course in earth jurisprudence during 2007.

== See also ==
- Common heritage of humanity
- Ecological civilization
- Environmental personhood
- Earth Charter
- Indigenous law
- Natural law
- Natural order
- Rights of nature
- Scale (analytical tool)
- Anthropogenic metabolism

== Literature ==
- Cullinan, C (2003), Wild Law: A Manifesto for Earth Justice, Green Books, Totnes, Devon, ISBN 1-903998-35-2
- Simon Boyle, 'On thin ice', The Guardian newspaper, London, November 2006
- Stephan Harding, 'Earthly rights', The Guardian newspaper, London, April 2007
- Silver Donald Cameron, 'When does a tree have rights?', The Chronicle Herald (Halifax, Nova Scotia), January, 2007
- Cormac Cullinan, 'If Nature Had Rights', Orion (online magazine), USA, January 2008.

== Related reading ==
- Abram, D (1996), The Spell of the Sensuous, Vintage Books, New York
- Berry, T (1999), The Great Work: Our Way into the Future, Bell Tower, New York
- Berry, T (2002), 'Rights of the Earth: Recognising the Rights of All Living Things' - Resurgence, No. 214, September/October 2002
- Berry, T (1996), Every Being Has Rights, 23rd Annual E. F. Schumacher Lectures, Stockbridge, Massachusetts
- Berry, T, Swimme, B (1992) The Universe Story: From the Primordial Flaring Forth to the Ecozoic Era - A Celebration of the Unfolding of the Cosmos, HarperCollins, New York
- Cullinan, C (2002) 'Justice For All: Human Governance Must Be Consistent With Universal laws' - Resurgence, No. 214, September/October 2002
- Gardner, J (2004) Human Rights and Human Obligations - Lecture at the International PEN Congress in Tromsø, Norway
- Reichel-Dolmatoff, G (1994) The Forest Within: The World-View of the Tukano Amazonian Indians, Green Books, Totnes
- Reichel-Dolmatoff, G (1997) Rainforest Shamans: Essays on the Tukano Indians of the Northwest Amazon, Green Books, Totnes
- Rühs, N.; Jones, A (2016) The Implementation of Earth Jurisprudence through Substantive Constitutional Rights of Nature Sustainability, 8, 174.
- Reid, D (2001) 'Earth Jurisprudence: What Lessons Can Be Learned from Celtic Influences on Scottish Law?' Presentation to Technical Session on Wilderness and Jurisprudence at the 7th World Wilderness Congress, Port Elizabeth, South Africa
- Roldán Ortega, R (2000) Indigenous Peoples of Colombia and the Law: A Critical Approach to the Study of Past and Present Situations, COAMA, Bogotá, Tercer Mundo Editores
- Stutzin, G (2002) 'Nature's Rights: Justice Requires that Nature Be Recognised As a Legal Entity' - Resurgence, No. 210, January / February 2002. Godofredo Stutzin was 1990 winner of The United Nations Environment Program (UNEP)'s Global 500 Roll of Honour which recognises the environmental achievements of individuals and organizations around the world
