= Christopher Chapple =

American Indologist and yoga scholar

Christopher Key Chapple is an Indologist and scholar of the renouncing religions of India, namely yoga, Jainism and Buddhism. He is Doshi Professor of Indic and Comparative Theology at Loyola Marymount University, Los Angeles. He has written several books on the history and philosophy of yoga, and on the intersection of religion and ecology.

== Life ==
Christopher Chapple received his bachelor's degree in comparative literature and religious studies at the State University of New York at Stony Brook in 1976. He went on to complete his master's degree in Buddhism (1978) and PhD in history of religions (1980) at Fordham University. He noted in an interview that he initially struggled to reconcile Buddhism's "emptiness" with Yoga's self-realisation, and commented that the Yogavasistha answered the debate on "the tension between emptiness and consciousness in superbly poetic verse."

Chapple advises the International Summer School of Jain Studies, the Yale Forum on Religion and Ecology, the Ahimsa Center (Pomona), the Dharma Academy of North America (Berkeley), the Jain Studies Centre (SOAS), the South Asian Studies Association, and International School for Jain Studies (New Delhi). He founded the Masters Program in Yoga at Loyola Marymount University, where he is Doshi Professor of Indic and Comparative Theology.

== Reception ==
Reviewing Living Landscapes in Worldviews, Elizabeth McAnally writes that the book "provides a refreshing perspective on the Earth-affirming dimensions of these traditions, which are sometimes accused of renouncing and denying the physical world." She describes the book as a "wonderful resource", written engagingly and combining scholarship with personal narrative. She recommends it as "an excellent elemental case study" of religions in India, and calls the book "itself a meditation on the elements".

Stuart Sarbacker, reviewing Yoga and the Luminous: Patañjali's Spiritual Path to Freedom for Journal of Hindu Studies, states that the "hallmark" of the book is Chapple's skill in navigating both contemporary yoga practice and academic research. Sarbacker describes Chapple as among the United States's most influential yoga scholars

Ellison Findly, reviewing the edited collection Hinduism and Ecology in Journal of the American Oriental Society, describes Chapple's introduction as excellent, noting the tension between philosophies that see salvation in leaving the world and those that see the world as the site of "karma and ego-based individuality". The former in Findly's view have no place for caring for the environment, whereas the latter are more concerned and can work towards a "contemporary environmental ethic".

== Works ==
=== Yoga ===
- Karma and Creativity (1986, SUNY)
- Nonviolence to Animals, Earth, and Self in Asian Traditions (1993, SUNY)
- Reconciling Yogas (2003, SUNY)
- Yoga and the Luminous: Patanjali's Spiritual Path to Freedom (2008, SUNY)
- Living Landscapes: Meditations on the Elements in Hindu, Buddhist, and Jain Yogas (2020, SUNY)

Edited

- Yoga in Jainism (2015, Routledge)
- Engaged Emancipation: Mind, Morals and Make-Believe in the Moksopaya/Yogavasistha (2016, with Aridam Chakrabarti, SUNY)

=== Religion and ecology ===
- Ecological Prospects: Religious, Scientific, and Aesthetic Perspectives (1994, SUNY)
- Hinduism and Ecology (2000, with Mary Evelyn Tucker, Harvard)
- Jainism and Ecology (2002, Harvard)
- Yoga and Ecology (2009, Deepak Heritage)
- In Praise of Mother Earth: The Prthivi Sukta of the Atharva Veda (2011, with O. P. Dwivedi)
