= Lenore Janis =

American businesswoman (1934–2021)

- Born: March 4, 1935; New York City
- Died: January 31, 2021 (aged 85); Brookfield, Connecticut
- Occupations: Businesswoman, city official

Lenore Janis (March 4, 1934 – January 31, 2021) was an American businesswoman and city official, a founder and president of Professional Women in Construction.

== Early life and education ==
Lenore Janis was born in New York City, the daughter of Harry G. Janis and Gussie Weinstein Janis. Her father, who was born in Russia, owned an ironworks. She studied theatre at Bennington College, but left to marry. After her divorce, she completed a bachelor's degree in literature at the University of Connecticut.

== Career ==
Janis worked in public relations and worked in theatre as a young woman. She began and ran the Jewish Heritage Theatre for Children program at the 92nd Street Y in the 1960s. After her father's death in the early 1970s, she and her brothers took over the family ironworks business. "For years I was the only woman attending various industry functions and often mistaken for someone who must be in the interior decoration business," she recalled later.

Janis founded her own construction business, ERA Steel, in 1979. In 1980, she helped to founder Professional Women in Construction, a trade organization. She was active in crafting New York state legislation, passed in 1983, opening more state construction jobs to woman-owned businesses. In 1986, she was appointed to head the Bureau of Building Management in New York City. She was president of Professional Women in Construction from 1995 to her retirement in 2015. She was also vice president of the National Minority Business Council. Janis contributed a chapter, "Women in Construction", to Construction in Cities: : Social, Environmental, Political, and Economic Concerns (2000), and was a frequent speaker at national and international meetings in her industry, including the International Cost Engineering Conference in Paris.

== Awards ==
Janis received the Susan B. Anthony Award from the New York City chapter of the National Organization for Women. Her alma mater, White Plains High School, inducted her into its Hall of Fame, as an outstanding alumna. She won the 2011 Craftsmanship Award from the General Society of Mechanics & Tradesmen of the City of New York.

== Personal life ==
Janis married and divorced three times. She had two sons, Peter and John. Peter died in 2011. She died in 2021, at a care home in Brookfield, Connecticut, from complications of COVID-19, aged 86 years.
