= John Grim =

John Grim may refer to:

- John Grim (baseball), American catcher in Major League Baseball
- John Allen Grim, co-founder and co-director of the Forum on Religion and Ecology at Yale University
