= Wild Law =

2003 book by Cormac Cullinan

- Author: Cormac Cullinan
- Language: English
- Publisher: Siber Ink & Green Books
- Publication date: August 2002 & November 2003
- Publication place: South Africa & United Kingdom
- Media type: Print (Paperback)
- Pages: 260 & 224p
- ISBN: 0-9584417-8-2 (Siber Ink); ISBN 1-903998-35-2 (Green)

Wild Law: A Manifesto for Earth Justice is a book by Cormac Cullinan that proposes recognizing natural communities and ecosystems as legal persons with legal rights. The book explains the concept of wild law, that is, human laws that are consistent with earth jurisprudence. Foreworded by Thomas Berry, the book was published by Green Books in November 2003 in association with The Gaia Foundation, London. It was first published in South Africa, the author's home country, in August 2002 by Siber Ink.

The feasibility of developing a new form of jurisprudence was discussed at a conference in Washington attended by Thomas Berry in April 2001, organised by the Gaia Foundation. A group of people involved with law and indigenous peoples attended from South Africa, Britain, Colombia, Canada and the United States.

Since then Wild Law has been at the centre of many conferences and residential workshops:

- A conference based on the concept of wild law was held in November 2005 at the University of Brighton. The conference was chaired by former Environment Minister Michael Meacher MP and speakers included Jacqueline McGlade, head of the European Environment Agency and Lynda Warren of the Environment Agency.
- In November 2006, a conference based on the book was held at the University of Brighton in the UK and organised jointly by UKELA and ELF. 'A Walk on the Wild Side: Changing Environmental Law' and was chaired by John Elkington (of SustainAbility and the ELF Advisory Council) with guest speakers, Cormac Cullinan, Norman Baker MP (former Liberal Democrat Environment Spokesman), Satish Kumar (Resurgence) and Begonia Filgueira (Gaia Law Ltd).
- "A 'Wild Law' Response to Climate Change" workshop was held in September 2007 to develop a practical approach for applying Wild Law principles which are already helping shift legal processes in the US and South Africa. Organised by UKELA, with support from ELF and the Gaia Foundation, London and sponsored by the Body Shop. Held at a conference centre in Derbyshire in the UK, with internationally renowned speakers Cormac Cullinan, author of Wild Law, Professor Brian Goodwin, visiting scholar and teacher on MSc in Holistic Science, at the Schumacher College, International Centre for Ecological Studies, Devon, Andrew Kimbrell, executive director of The Center for Food Safety in United States and founder of the International Center for Technology Assessment, Peter Roderick, director of the Climate justice Programme and was Friends of the Earth's lawyer in London from 1996.
- Wild Law was discussed in April 2007 at a conference, hosted by Center for Earth Jurisprudence, a collaborative initiative of Barry & St. Thomas Universities, Florida, USA, on the emerging field of Earth Jurisprudence.
- The "'Wild Law' – Ideas into Action" residential workshop is to be held in September 2008, to launch the first phase of international research by the UKELA and the Gaia Foundation to identify Wild Law in practice and provide a Wild Law toolkit for decision makers and practitioners. Held at a conference centre in Derbyshire in the UK, workshop leaders include: Mellese Damtie, Ethiopian lawyer and biologist, former Dean of the Legal Department at Ethiopia's Civil Service College, Andrew Kimbrell, public interest attorney, activist and author, executive director of The Centre for Food Safety in United States and founder of the International Centre for Technology Assessment; and Professor Lynda Warren, emeritus professor at Aberystwyth University, environmental consultant and the research supervisor. Also participating, research paper coordinators, Begonia Filgueira, of Gaia Law Ltd and ERIC Ltd, and Ian Mason, practising barrister and Director of the Earth Jurisprudence Resource Centre; Cormac Cullinan, an environmental lawyer based in Cape Town, South Africa, author of Wild Law, director of the leading South African environmental law firm, Cullinan and Associates Inc., and CEO of EnAct International, an environmental governance consultancy; and Ng’anga Thiong’o, legal and policy adviser for Kenyan community NGO, Porini, and formerly to Green Belt Movement and Nobel prize winner, Wangari Maathai. This event is facilitated by Elizabeth Rivers, former commercial lawyer and professional facilitator, and Vicki Elcoate, executive director of UKELA.

The Tamaqua Borough Sewage Sludge Ordinance enacted in 2006 by the 7,000 inhabits of the community of Tamaqua, PA is based on the 2002 ideas set out in Wild Law and has been viewed potentially as one of the most important events of 2006. Tamaqua's ordinance not only denies the right of corporations to spread sewage sludge as fertilizer on farmland, even when the farmer is willing, the ordinance recognizes natural communities and ecosystems as legal persons with legal rights. This ordinance is among the first " wild laws" to be passed anywhere in the world.
