= Roger S. Gottlieb =

Jewish American philosopher, environmentalists, ecotheologian, and author

- Born: October 20, 1946 (age 79); White Plains, New York, U.S.
- Title: Professor of Philosophy
- Spouse: Miriam Greenspan
- Children: 3
- Relatives: Rabbi Dovid Gottlieb (brother)

Academic background
- Education: White Plains High School
- Alma mater: Brandeis University
- Thesis: Kierkegaard's and Nietzsche's Theories of the Transition from One Value System to Another
- Influences: Pierre Teilhard de Chardin and Thomas Berry (spiritual ecology); Søren Kierkegaard, Karl Marx, Mahatma Gandhi, Martin Luther King, Elie Wiesel, Joanna Macy, Gautama Buddha, Jewish tradition (the prophets of the bible), feminism (feminist theorists), the New Left, and environmental ethicists

Academic work
- Discipline: Philosopher
- Main interests: Environmental philosophy, Religious environmentalism, Social and Political Philosophy, Ethics, Spirituality.
- Website: https://users.wpi.edu/~gottlieb/

Roger S. Gottlieb (born October 20, 1946) is professor of philosophy and Paris Fletcher Distinguished Professor in the Humanities at Worcester Polytechnic Institute. He has written and edited 21 books, including two Nautilus Book Awards winners, and over 150 papers on philosophy, political theory, environmental ethics, religious studies, religious environmentalism, religious life, contemporary spirituality, the Holocaust, and disability. He is internationally known for his work as a leading analyst and exponent of religious environmentalism, for his passionate and moving account of spirituality in an age of environmental crisis, and for his innovative and humane description of the role of religion in a democratic society.

Gottlieb has edited six academic book series (which have collectively published more than 50 titles), serves on the editorial boards of several academic journals. He is contributing editor to Tikkun magazine, and has appeared online on Patheos, Huffington, Grist, Wall Street Journal, Washington Post, Real Clear Religion, and many others. His writings have appeared in top academic journals (such as The Journal of Philosophy, Journal of the American Academy of Religion, Conservation Biology, and Ethics); in popular publications (such as E Magazine online, The Boston Globe, and Orion Afield); and in anthologies of Jewish writing, environmental ethics, religious life, spirituality, the Holocaust, and disability; and in the Encyclopedia of Philosophy.

== Life ==
Roger S. Gottlieb was born on October 20, 1946, in White Plains, New York, where he grew up in a middle-class suburban family. He graduated from White Plains High School in 1964. From there he went on to Brandeis University intending to become a psychologist, but after one course found it "unbelievably dull" and soon became hooked on philosophy. He earned a BA (Summa Cum Laude, Phi Beta Kappa, Special Honors) in philosophy in 1968 and a Ph.D. 1975.

He was a visiting assistant professor from 1974 to 1977 at University of Connecticut and 1978 to 1980 at Tufts University. In 1980–1981, he was awarded a National Endowment for the Humanities Fellowship, and in 1981 was hired as a professor of philosophy at Worcester Polytechnic Institute where he was granted tenure in 1985, and appointed Paris Fletcher Distinguished Professor from 1995 to 1997. Since 2006, he has also been a visiting professor of Jewish studies at Wake Forest University divinity school.

Gottlieb lives in Boston with his wife, noted psychotherapist and author Miriam Greenspan, and shares in the care of his daughters, Anna and Esther. Their first child (a son) was born with brain damage, living only five days without coming home from the hospital. Three years later they had a third child, Esther, who was born with multiple handicaps. Gottlieb recounts how these events had a profound impact on him and forced him to grow spiritually. The spiritual and political dimensions of his relation to Esther, who has multiple disabilities, forms part of Chapter 8 of Joining Hands.

Gottlieb is affiliated with the Jewish Renewal movement. His brother is Dovid Gottlieb (a Haredi Rabbi).

== Professional associations ==
- American Philosophical Association
- American Academy of Religion
  - steering committee, Religion and Ecology Section, 1994–97, 2009–12
  - steering committee, Religion and Disability Section, 2002–2007
  - Sustainability Task Force
- International Society for the Study of Environmental Ethics
- American Political Science Association
- Philosophical Society for the Study of Genocide and the Holocaust (co-founder)
- Radical Philosophy Association
- Interdisciplinary Environmental Association

== Selected works ==
- History and Subjectivity: The Transformation of Marxist Theory. Temple University Press, 1987; Humanities Press Paperback edition, 1993.
- An Anthology of Western Marxism: From Lukacs and Gramsci to Socialist-Feminism. Oxford University Press, 1989.
- Thinking the Unthinkable: Meanings of the Holocaust. Paulist Press, 1990.
- Marxism 1844-1990: Origins, Betrayal, Rebirth. Routledge, 1992.
- The Ecological Community: Environmental Challenges for Philosophy, Politics, and Morality. Routledge, 1996.
- A Spirituality of Resistance: Finding a Peaceful Heart and Protecting the Earth. Crossroad, 1999; Paperback edition, with a new ‘Afterword.’ Rowman and Littlefield, 2003. (Note: Won praise from Elie Wiesel and Protestant theologian John B. Cobb who called it "a true spiritual guide for our day," and was excerpted in Tikkun and Orion Afield.)
- Joining Hands: Religion and Politics Together for Social Change. Westview Press, 2002, Paperback edition, 2004.
- Liberating Faith: Religious Voices for Justice, Peace, and Ecological Wisdom. Rowman and Littlefield, 2003.
- This Sacred Earth: Religion, Nature, Environment. Second Edition. Routledge, 2003. (Note: First anthology in the new transdisciplinary field of spiritual ecology)
- A Greener Faith: Religious Environmentalism and our Planet’s Future. Oxford University Press, 2006; paperback edition, with a new preface, 2009. (Note: Endorsed by the heads of both the Sierra Club and the National Council of Churches, as well as leading ecotheologian Thomas Berry.)
- The Oxford Handbook of Religion and Ecology. Oxford University Press, 2006; paperback, 2010.
- Religion and the Environment, Volumes 1-IV. Routledge, 2010
- Engaging Voices: Tales of Morality and Meaning in an Age of Global Warming. Baylor University Press, 2011. (Note: Nautilus Award for fiction)
- Spirituality: What It Is and Why It Matters. Oxford University Press, 2012. (Note: Nautilus Book Award and called “best book of the year” by Spirituality and Practice)
- Political and Spiritual: Essays on Religion, Environment, Disability, and Justice. Rowman and Littlefield, 2015. (Note: Collection of selected past essays as well as new essays on technology, death, and a fascinating intellectual autobiography.)
- Morality and the Environmental Crisis. Cambridge University Press, 2019. (Note: Received the “book most likely to save the planet” award from Independent Publisher and was semi-finalist for the Siskiyou Prize for new environmental literature. It was also praised by political theorist Paul Wapner and environmental ethicist Larry Rasmussen, who called it “The best book on the subject.”)

== See also ==
- Deep ecology
- Ecospirituality
- Ecotheology
- Environmental communication
- Environmental education
- Environmental sociology
- Environmental studies
- Environmental theology
- Human ecology
- Judaism and environmentalism
- List of environmental philosophers
- List of political theorists
- Political ecology
- Stewardship
