= Cormac Cullinan =

South African lawyer

Cormac Cullinan is a South African environmental attorney, author and leading figure in the global Rights of Nature movement. He is a director of the leading South African environmental law firm, Cullinan & Associates Inc, and director of the Wild Law Institute which pioneers eco-centric laws and governance systems. He has worked on environmental law and policy and the rights of Nature in more than 25 countries. He lives in Cape Town.

== Early life and education ==
Cullinan was born in Pietermaritzburg, South Africa, and educated at Maritzburg College and the University of Natal (now University of KwaZulu Natal) where he graduated with Bachelor of Arts (Honours) in English literature, and Bachelor of Laws degrees. He has a Master of Laws (environmental) from King’s College, University of London.

== Earth Jurisprudence and Rights of Nature ==
Inspired by Thomas Berry’s ten principles for the revision of jurisprudence, Cullinan published Wild Law: a manifesto for Earth Justice (2002). Wild Law was the first book to use and define the term “Earth Jurisprudence” which is now central to the United Nations Living in Harmony with Nature Programme. Cullinan authored the chapter on Earth Jurisprudence in the second edition of the Oxford Handbook on International Environmental Law (2021). Earth jurisprudence is taught in Universities in many countries and several books have been published on the subject of Wild Law.

Cullinan played a leading role in the drafting of the Universal Declaration of the Rights of Mother Earth (adopted in 2010 by a Peoples’ World Congress on Climate Change in Bolivia) and co-founded the Global Alliance for Rights of Nature (GARN) in Ecuador in 2010. Cullinan drafted the Peoples’ Convention that established the International Tribunal on the Rights of Nature and presided over the hearing of the Tribunal in Paris (2015) and the hearings of the European Tribunal in Defense of the Aquatic Ecosystems (2021).

In 2022 he co-founded the Antarctic Rights Initiative and prepared the first draft Antarctica Declaration. He co-founded the Biodiversity Law Centre and in 2025 the Wild Law Institute began an initiative to recognise the Table Mountain range as a legal subject. Cullinan is a member of the executive committee of GARN, and the Antarctic Rights working group.

Cullinan has addressed conferences throughout the world on Earth Jurisprudence and the rights of Nature, including the UN General Assembly in 2011.

== Life and career ==
As a student in South Africa, Cullinan was president of the Students’ Representative Council, and became an anti-apartheid activist. He was a founder member and first chairperson of the Durban Democratic Alliance, a member of the United Democratic Front (UDF) that led the “above ground” struggle against apartheid in South Africa. Cullinan began his legal career as a shipping attorney in Durban before working as a commercial and tax lawyer in Luxembourg and London. After completing an LLM (environmental law), he founded the environmental governance consultancy EnAct International, in London, which worked in more than 40 countries. In 1999, he returned to South Africa and now heads both South Africa’s oldest specialist environmental law firm and the Wild Law Institute.

== Awards and recognitions ==
In 2025, Cullinan was awarded the Shackleton Medal for his work and efforts to protect the Polar Regions. In 2021, he won the Nicke Steele award for the South African environmentalist of the year and in 2018 received the Enviropaedia Ecologic lifetime achievement award. In 2016, Cullinan was included in Warrior Lawyers: From Manila to Manhattan, Attorneys for the Earth. In 2008, he was listed among the world's most extraordinary environmental champions in Planet Savers: 301 Extraordinary Environmentalists, which lists 301 people in history to be commended for their important role in saving and conserving the environment and promoting sustainable governance.

== Selected publications ==
- Chapter 14 Earth Jurisprudence in The Oxford Handbook of International Environmental Law (Second Edition), Lavanya Rajamani and Jacqueline Peel (editors).
- The Coast, Glavovic, GC, Cullinan, C, and Groenink, M. Fuggle & Rabie’s Environmental Management in South Africa, Strydom, HA, & King, ND (editors) (third edition), Juta Law, Cape Town, 2018
- Great Barrier Reef v Australian Federal and State Governments and others, Cullinan, C (pp 39–55) in Law As If Earth Really Mattered: The Wild Law Judgement Project, Nicole Rodgers and Michelle Maloney (eds), Routledge, 2017.
- The Rule of Nature’s Law, Cullinan, C. (pp 94–108) in Rule of Law for Nature. New Dimensions and Ideas in Environmental Law, Christina Voight (ed), Cambridge University Press
- A history of wild law, pp 12–23 and If Nature had rights what would we need to give up? pp 230–235, Cullinan, C in Exploring wild law: The philosophy of earth jurisprudence.
- The legal case for the Universal Declaration of the Rights of Mother Earth, Cullinan, C. pp 88-96 in The Rights of Nature: The Case for the Universal Declaration of the Rights of Mother Earth, 2011, Council of Canadians, Global Exchange and Pachamama Alliance
- Earth Jurisprudence: From Colonization to Participation, Cullinan, C, 2010 State of the World: Transforming Cultures From Consumerism to Sustainability, WW Norton & Company, New York, USA, and London, UK, 2010 (pages 143 – 148) (Note on author, p 143)
- Wild Law: A Manifesto for Earth Justice, first published by Siber Ink, Cape Town, South Africa, August 2002 ISBN 0-9584417-8-2; also by Green Books, Totnes, Devon, 2003 ISBN 1-903998-35-2.
- "Integrated Coastal Management Law" Establishing and strengthening National Legal Frameworks for Integrated Coastal Management, FAO Legislative Study No. 93, Rome, 2006.
- Recent trends in monitoring, control and surveillance systems for capture fisheries, by P Flewelling; C Cullinan; RP Sautter and JE Reynolds. FAO Fisheries Technical Paper 415, Rome, FAO, 2002.
- "Law and markets - Improving the legal environment for agricultural marketing" FAO, 2000, AGS Bulletin, No. 139. "Land Ownership and Foreigners: A Comparative Analysis of Regulatory Approaches to the Acquisition and Use of Land by Foreigners." FAO Legal Papers Online, 1999.
- Author of legal section of Integrated coastal area management and agriculture, forestry and fisheries. FAO Guidelines (N Scialabba (ed.) Environment and Natural Resource Service, FAO, Rome. 256p.
- Legal and institutional aspects of integrated coastal area management in national legislation. FAO Legislative study, 1994 (118 pages).
- 'If Nature Had Rights', Orion, USA, January 2008.
