= Krishna Kant Shukla =

Dr Krishna Kant Shukla
- Also known as: KK Krishna
- Born: Krishna Kant Shukla
- Origin: Varanasi, Uttar Pradesh, India
- Genres: Indian Classical Music; Indian folk oral traditions; Bhajans; Poetry of self-realized saints; Kirtans & Chants; Vedic Shloka; Sufi poetry
- Occupations: Singer; Composer; Poet; Writer; Professor; Physicist; Ecologist
- Instruments: Vocals; Tanpura (instrument); Harmonium; Western classical guitar
- Years active: 1976–present
- Label: Self (2008–present)
- Website: krishnakantshukla.org

Krishna Kant Shukla is a physicist, musician, poet, ecologist and educator. Currently, he lives in Varanasi, Bharat (India) and travels all over the world, giving music concerts and lectures. He is a disciple of the late Pandit Kumar Gandharva and Ustaad Ali Akbar Khan. His concerts and interviews have been aired on National Television and Radio in India several times. His interview on a U.S. radio station has been widely acclaimed. His interview has also appeared on the front page of Times of India.

His music concerts consist of singing the poetry of the self realized saints of India, such as Kabir, Gorakshanath, Tulsidas, Tyagaraja, Surdas, Meera on a base of Indian classical music. He has also translated these songs into English and reads out his translation before singing the song in the original vernacular.

He has also extensively researched and recorded the folk songs of rural India, which are becoming extinct. Some of these songs belong to endangered living oral folk traditions that are over fourteen hundred years old. He also sings these songs. His lectures on "Spiritual ecology" have also received wide acclaim in India and abroad. This is a newly emerging field in the general area of Religion, Science and the Environment. He is founding trustee and member of Saha Astitva Foundation, a charitable organization that has built a model eco village and organic farm in a tribal area in Maharashtra. This project is the practical aspect of his work on Spiritual Ecology. Dr. Krishna Kant Shukla is considered by many to be a national treasure. He is an empaneled member of Indian Council for Cultural Relations (ICCR), an arm of Ministry of External Affairs (India) Government of India. This entitles him officially to represent India and Indian culture as a Cultural Ambassador in foreign countries.

In January 2025, Dr. Krishna Kant Shukla was awarded the "UTTAR PRADESH GAURAV SAMMAN" which is the highest honor awarded by the State of Uttar Pradesh, for his work in the fields of Music, Physics and Spiritual Ecology.The award was given to him by the Chief Minister of Uttar Pradesh, Yogi Adityanath and also the Vice President of India, Shri Jagdeep Dhankhar.

== Early life ==
Krishna Kant Shukla was born in Patna, Bihar, Bharat(India) and raised in Varanasi, Uttar Pradesh. Youngest of four boys, both his parents were professors in Banaras Hindu University. He was musically gifted as a child. Encouraged by his mother, he had taught himself to play several musical instruments by the time he reached his teens. When he was ten years old, he went to U.K. with his mother, who had gone there to pursue her doctorate. There, he studied first in St. Edmunds Primary School and later in Dudley Grammar School. Here, he topped in almost all subjects, including Physics, Math, Music, Latin, Chemistry, Biology, English and French. He recalls how he heard, for the first time, Mozart's Eine kleine Nachtmusik and, the same evening, he came home and worked out the whole score, by memory, on the recorder. After three years in U.K., at the age of thirteen, Krishna returned to Bharat(India) and joined India's top school, the famous Modern School (New Delhi), which was founded by Mahatma Gandhi to impart the best of Eastern and Western education to deserving children. After graduating with a distinction in Math, Krishna joined India's top institution, St. Stephen's College, Delhi for his undergraduate degree in Physics Honours. He then enrolled in the Doctoral program in Physics at the University at Buffalo, The State University of New York. Here, he was appointed as "visiting lecturer" and taught full courses in undergraduate Physics. He was given an award for "Excellence in Teaching" by his University. While pursuing his doctorate, Krishna started studying Indian Classical Music with Shrimati Lakshmi Shankar and Dr. Tapan Bhattacharya. While still a graduate student in Buffalo, New York, Krishna was actively involved in organizing Indian Classical Music concerts for visiting musicians from Bharat(India), many of whom were living legends. In his own words, "This period turned out to be crucial for my later metamorphosis from a Physicist and a Mathematician to a Musician". Krishna would go to each of these visiting stalwarts, and ask them to teach him something of their art. He thus took classes from Ustaad Vilayat Khan, Pandit Ajoy Chakrabarty, Shree Vijay Kichlu, Ustaad Rashid Khan, Pandit Sandeep Ghosh, and several others. During this period, Krishna also became much influenced by the music of the legendary Great Pandit Kumar Gandharva. In particular, he was entranced by the "Nirguna Bhajans" ("songs of emptiness") of Pandit Kumar Gandharva. These songs, originally composed several centuries ago by Kabir, Gorakshanath and others, were and are sung by wandering troubadours in Bharat(India) and belong to a living folk Oral Tradition that is over fourteen hundred years old. Pandit Kumar Gandharva had brought these songs to the classical stage. In Krishna's own words, "These songs tugged at my soul incessantly until I had no other option but to give my life to them".

== From physics to music ==
Physics

Dr. Krishna Kant Shukla's PhD work is titled "Calculations of Electron Effective Mass based on 3-D Kroenig Penny Model with Application to Solids". A pioneering mathematical model to predict the behaviour of electrons in simple crystal lattices. This work was later published in the book "Quantum Statistical theory of Superconductivity" edited by Dr. Van der Meswe; Reidel Kluwer Book co. After his Doctorate, Dr. Shukla joined Hartwick College, Oneonta, New York, as an assistant professor in Physics and Astronomy, in 1991. It was here, while teaching astronomy, that his life took an unusual turn.

Music

In 1992, Dr. Krishna Kant Shukla resigned his job as physics professor and went to Ali Akbar College of Music in San Rafael, California to study Indian Classical music with the great Maestro Ustaad Ali Akbar Khan. He studied Vocal and Sarode here. In 1994, he returned to India to study, research, record and, eventually perform, the Bhajans (songs) belonging to the living oral folk traditions of Kabir and Gorakshanath and other saints, such as Tulsidas, Meera, Tukaram, Tyagaraja, Purandara Dasa and Surdas. Between 1994 and 2004, he also traveled through much of rural Northern India to learn and record the folk songs of the villages. With the advent of T.V. and Globalization, many of these folk songs, and the traditions that nurtured and protected their continuity, have become extinct. In his own words, "These folk songs contain much wisdom, beauty, and spiritual depth. It is this folk music, coming from the timeless soul of village India, that has given birth to many of the ragas of Indian Classical Music." In 2003, Modern School Diaspora Initiative hosted a function in New Delhi where Dr.Shukla was honoured by the ex president of India, K. R. Narayanan for performing an invaluable service to the country in researching and recording these folk songs.

Mr. Shubham Basu, Dy. Director AIMA mentions about Dr. Shukla's (physicist and musician) "…there are threads that might open a physicists thoughts on Spirituality and Spiritual seeker's thoughts on Science…and the best part is Dr. Shukla sails on them with his Music."

== Music ==
Concert Tours:

- Kabir in Song: Musical Traditions of a Great Religious Poet of India (2003) – United States at Stanford
- Poetry of Self Realized Saints of India (2004) – United States at UC Berkeley, Hartwick College
- Poetry of Self Realized Saints of India (2010) – United States
- Ahimsa Concert: Bhajans of Kabir and Other Saint-Poets from India (2010) - University of California
- Benefit concert for the homeless (2011) - United States at Maui(Hawaii)
- Concert with Ram Das and Peter Russell (2011) - United States at Mauii (Hawaii)
- North Indian Devotional Music from the Hindu and Muslim (Sufi) Traditions (2014) - United States at Hartwick College

Albums:

- Kabir in Song (2000)
- Live Concert Delhi 2007 Part:1 (2007)
- Live Concert Delhi 2007 Part:2 (2007)
- Meher Baani (2010)

== Spiritual ecology ==
Krishna has delivered lectures on spiritual ecology all over the globe. The foundation lies in the natural or vedantic worldview. Notable Lectures & Talks:

- Dialogues with divinity, and their relationship to creativity, in the Hindu tradition
- Spiritual Ecology
- Spiritual Ecology: The Indian Village as a Model of Sustainability.
- Spiritual Ecology & Research Paradigms at Management Development Institute (MDI), Gurgaon Bharat (India).
- Science, Spirituality and the Environment at AIIMS on 15 April 2010. Event Organised by Center for community medicine.

Interviews on the subject

- Aaj Savere by Doordarshan (2014)
- Dr. Krishna Kant Shukla's radio interview with "Tributaries Radio", Boulder, Colorado, U.S.A.

Spiritual Ecology in Action:

- Krishna, and his friends Kalyani and Daniel Uppendahl set up a model eco-village in the village of Ganeshpuri, Bharat (India). The Saha Astitva Foundation which is a registered charity creating a model year-round organic eco-farm. It drew interest of research community too.

== Famous quotes ==
His popular quotes from his lectures, concerts and interviews:-

- "What you don't use, You lose"
- "What you abuse, You lose."
- "Music is not a way to reach god. Music is god."
- "Every single man, woman and child on the planet must, to the best of their capacity, become activists for the environment if we are to reverse our royal collective march to oblivion"
- "Nature is our mother. She is not a resource for human consumption."
- "Western Science, in its present form, is toxic. It must be infused with love and humility, and an ethical code of honor to renounce any experiment or procedure that causes harm to the environment."
