= Llewellyn Vaughan-Lee =

Sufi mystic

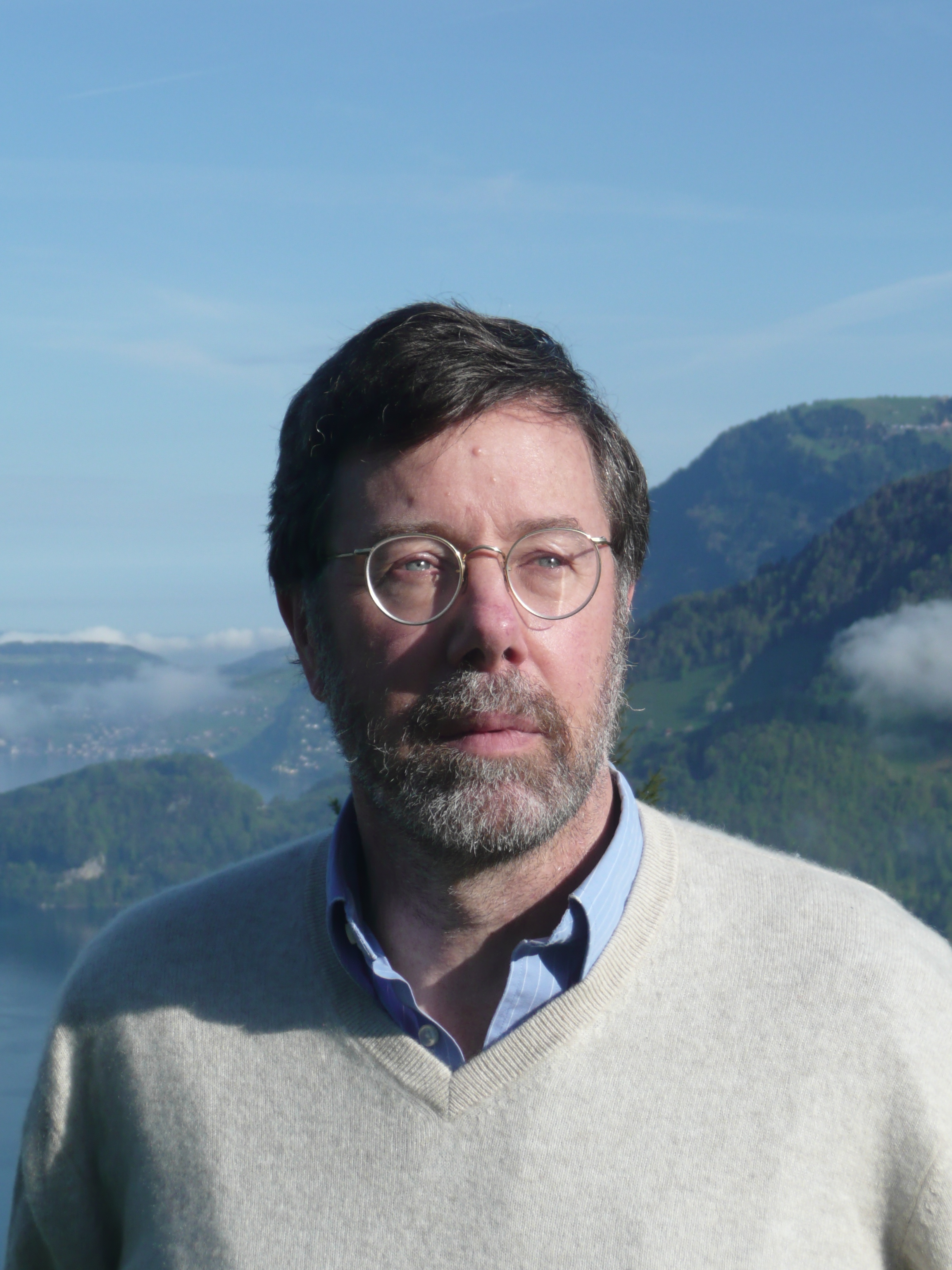
- Born: 1953 (age 72–73); London, England
- Occupations: lecturer, author

Llewellyn Vaughan-Lee (born 1953, in London) is a Sufi mystic and lineage successor in the Naqshbandiyya-Mujaddidiyya Sufi Order. He is an extensive lecturer and author of several books about Sufism, mysticism, dreamwork and spirituality.

== Life and education ==
Llewellyn Vaughan-Lee was born in London in 1953. He began following the Naqshbandiyya-Mujaddidiyya Sufi path at the age of 19, after meeting Irina Tweedie, author of Daughter of Fire: A Diary of a Spiritual Training with a Sufi Master. He became Irina Tweedie's successor and a teacher in the Naqshbandiyya Sufi Order.

He initially trained as an English high school teacher and taught for six years, before completing a Ph.D. on Jungian Psychology and Shakespeare. In 1991 he moved to Northern California and founded The Golden Sufi Center to help make available the teachings of this Sufi lineage. He currently lives in California.

== Works ==
Author of several books, Llewellyn Vaughan-Lee has lectured extensively throughout the United States, Canada, and Europe on Sufism, mysticism, Jungian psychology and dreamwork. He has also specialised in the area of dreamwork, integrating the ancient Sufi approach to dreams with the insights of Jungian psychology. Since 2000 the focus of his writing and teaching has been on spiritual responsibility in our present time of transition, and an awakening global consciousness of oneness. More recently he has written about the feminine, the world soul, the anima mundi, and the emerging field of spiritual ecology. He has also hosted a number of Sufi conferences bringing together different Sufi orders in North America.

His initial work from 1990 to 2000, including his first eleven books, was to make the Sufi path more accessible to the Western seeker. The second series of books, starting from the year 2000 with The Signs of God, are focused on a spiritual teachings about oneness and how to bring them into contemporary life, with the final book in this series being Alchemy of Light. He is editor and contributor to the 2013 anthology Spiritual Ecology: The Cry of the Earth (Summer 2013, new edition Fall 2016), which was followed the same year with the publication of his work Darkening of the Light: Witnessing the End of an Era. His most recent books are Seasons of the Sacred: Reconnecting to the Wisdom Within Nature and the Soul and Words from the Water's Edge: Mystical Writings of Llewellyn Vaughan-Lee. In Autumn of 2022 he began a podcast series, "Stories for a Living Future" about the need to reconnect our consciousness to the living Earth, what he terms "a deep ecology of consciousness."

Llewellyn has been featured in two films, One the Movie and Wake Up. He has also been featured in the television series Global Spirit and in August 2012, he was interviewed by Oprah Winfrey as a part of her Super Soul Sunday series. A regular contributor to Sufi magazine, Parabola, and other periodicals and websites, he also wrote a series of blogs between 2010 and 2017 on the Huffington Post. In Fall 2015, Parabola magazine featured a comprehensive interview with Llewellyn Vaughan-Lee on his life and work, Part of an Ancient Story: A Conversation with Llewellyn Vaughan-Lee. In 2019 he was interviewed by Bjork for her Cornucopia Tour Book.

== Bibliography ==
- The Lover and the Serpent: Dreamwork within a Sufi Tradition (1990: out of print)
- The Call and the Echo: Sufi Dreamwork and the Psychology of the Beloved (1992: out of print, reissued in 1998 as Catching the Thread: Sufism, Dreamwork, and Jungian Psychology)
- The Bond with the Beloved: The Mystical Relationship of the Lover and the Beloved (1993)
- In the Company of Friends: Dreamwork within a Sufi Group (1994)
- Travelling the Path of Love: Sayings of Sufi Masters (1995)
- Sufism: The Transformation of the Heart (1995)
- The Paradoxes of Love (1996)
- The Face Before I Was Born: A Spiritual Autobiography (1997, 2nd Edition 2009 with new Introduction and Epilogue)
- Catching the Thread: Sufism, Dreamwork, and Jungian Psychology (1998)
- The Circle of Love (1999)
- Love is a Fire: The Sufi's Mystical Journey Home (2000)
- The Signs of God (2001)
- Working with Oneness (2002)
- Light of Oneness (2004)
- Moshkel Gosha: A Story of Transformation (2005)
- Spiritual Power: How It Works (2005; second updated edition Spring 2019)
- Awakening the World: A Global Dimension to Spiritual Practice (2006)
- Alchemy of Light: Working with the Primal Energies of Life (2007; second updated edition November 2019)
- The Return of the Feminine and the World Soul (2009)
- Fragments of a Love Story: Reflections on the Life of a Mystic (2011)
- Prayer of the Heart in Christian and Sufi Mysticism (2012)
- Spiritual Ecology: the Cry of the Earth (Summer 2013. Second updated edition published Fall 2016)
- Darkening of the Light: Witnessing the End of an Era (Autumn 2013)
- Within the Heart of Hearts: A Story of Mystical Love (Spring 2015)
- For Love of the Real: A Story of Life's Mystical Secret (Autumn 2015)
- Spiritual Ecology: 10 Practices to Reawaken the Sacred in Everyday Life (Spring 2017)
- Including the Earth in Our Prayers: A Global Dimension to Spiritual Practice (Spring 2019; new edition of Awakening the World)
- Handbook for Survivalists: Caring for the Earth, A Series of Meditations (Winter 2020)
- Seasons of the Sacred: Reconnecting to the Wisdom Within Nature and the Soul (Spring 2021)
- Seeding the Future A Deep Ecology of Consciousness (Spring 2022)
- Words from the Water's Edge: Mystical Writings of Llewellyn Vaughan-Lee (Autumn 2025)
