= Jay Saldi =

American football player (born 1954)

No. 87, 81
- Position: Tight end

Personal information
- Born: October 8, 1954 (age 72); White Plains, New York, U.S.
- Listed height: 6 ft 3 in (1.91 m)
- Listed weight: 225 lb (102 kg)

Career information
- High school: White Plains
- College: South Carolina
- NFL draft: 1976: undrafted

Career history
- Dallas Cowboys (1976–1982); Chicago Bears (1983–1984); Denver Broncos (1985)*
- * Offseason or practice squad member only

Awards and highlights
- Super Bowl champion (XII)

Career NFL statistics
- Receptions: 84
- Receiving yards: 913
- Receiving touchdowns: 7
- Stats at Pro Football Reference

John Jay Saldi, IV (born October 8, 1954) is an American former professional football player who was a tight end in the National Football League (NFL) for the Dallas Cowboys and Chicago Bears. He played college football for the South Carolina Gamecocks.

== Early life ==
Saldi attended White Plains Senior High School, where he was an All-American linebacker, while also playing tight end in the offense. He practiced basketball and baseball as additional sports.

He accepted a football scholarship from the University of South Carolina, where he played as an undersized (205 pounds) defensive end as a true freshman, before suffering a leg injury.

The following year, he was moved to tight end and eventually became a starter as a junior. He was a part of a 56–20 win against Clemson University in 1975.

He was injured playing against Louisiana State University and missed the last 5 games of his senior season. He finished his college career with only 15 receptions.

== Professional career ==
=== Dallas Cowboys ===
After not being selected in the 1976 NFL draft, he was signed as an undrafted free agent by the Dallas Cowboys, because of his all-around athletic ability. From his rookie season, he played behind Billy Joe Dupree and was a standout special teams player.

In 1977, he was named a captain of the special teams unit. He made only 11 receptions in the season, but 2 of those were touchdowns. He was also used as a fullback in the spread formation. In the sixth game of the season against the Philadelphia Eagles, he blocked a punt that was returned for the decisive touchdown in a 16–10 win. He had an important fumble recovery in punt coverage during the NFC championship 23–6 win against the Minnesota Vikings. He was a member of the Super Bowl XII championship team, although he was de-activated for the game with a bruised leg muscle.

The next year, he suffered a broken right forearm in the fourth game against the St. Louis Cardinals. The Cowboys signed future hall of famer Jackie Smith as his replacement. Saldi caught Roger Staubach last career touchdown pass on December 30, 1979.

In 1980, the Cowboys used the two tight end offense more than any time before, allowing Saldi to have a career-high 25 receptions for 311 yards. His best play came in the NFC Wild Card Game against the Los Angeles Rams, making a 37-yard reception to set up the go-ahead touchdown in a 34–13 win. At one point assistant coach Mike Ditka was quoted as saying "Jay runs the best routes around. He's got the unique situation of being something of a combination tight end-wide receiver."

In 1981, he started five games and was used as the third tight end on short-yardage plays and the fourth wide receiver in some third-and-long scenarios. He sustained a knee and ankle injury during the 1982 training camp, that caused him to miss most of the season.

Just as Dupree was finishing his career, Doug Cosbie passed Saldi on the depth chart, so he forced the team to trade him to the Chicago Bears in exchange for a sixth round draft choice (#152-Eugene Lockhart) on May 11, 1983.

=== Chicago Bears ===
In 1983, Saldi reunited with Mike Ditka who was the head coach of the Chicago Bears, started 6 games, while registering 12 receptions for 119 yards. The next year, he started 7 games, splitting time with Emery Moorehead.

=== Denver Broncos ===
On August 5, 1985, he signed with the Denver Broncos, reuniting with head coach Dan Reeves who used to be a Cowboys assistant. He was waived on August 26.

== Personal life ==
Saldi was the coach and general manager of the Dallas Hoopsters, the Cowboys players' basketball team. He later teamed with veteran sportscaster Bill Mercer to provide color commentary on World Class Championship Wrestling syndicated broadcasts in the summer of 1982. His son John Saldi tried out for the Dallas Cowboys in 2006 and 2007, but failed.
