= Irina Tweedie =

Russian-British Sufi teacher (1907–1999)

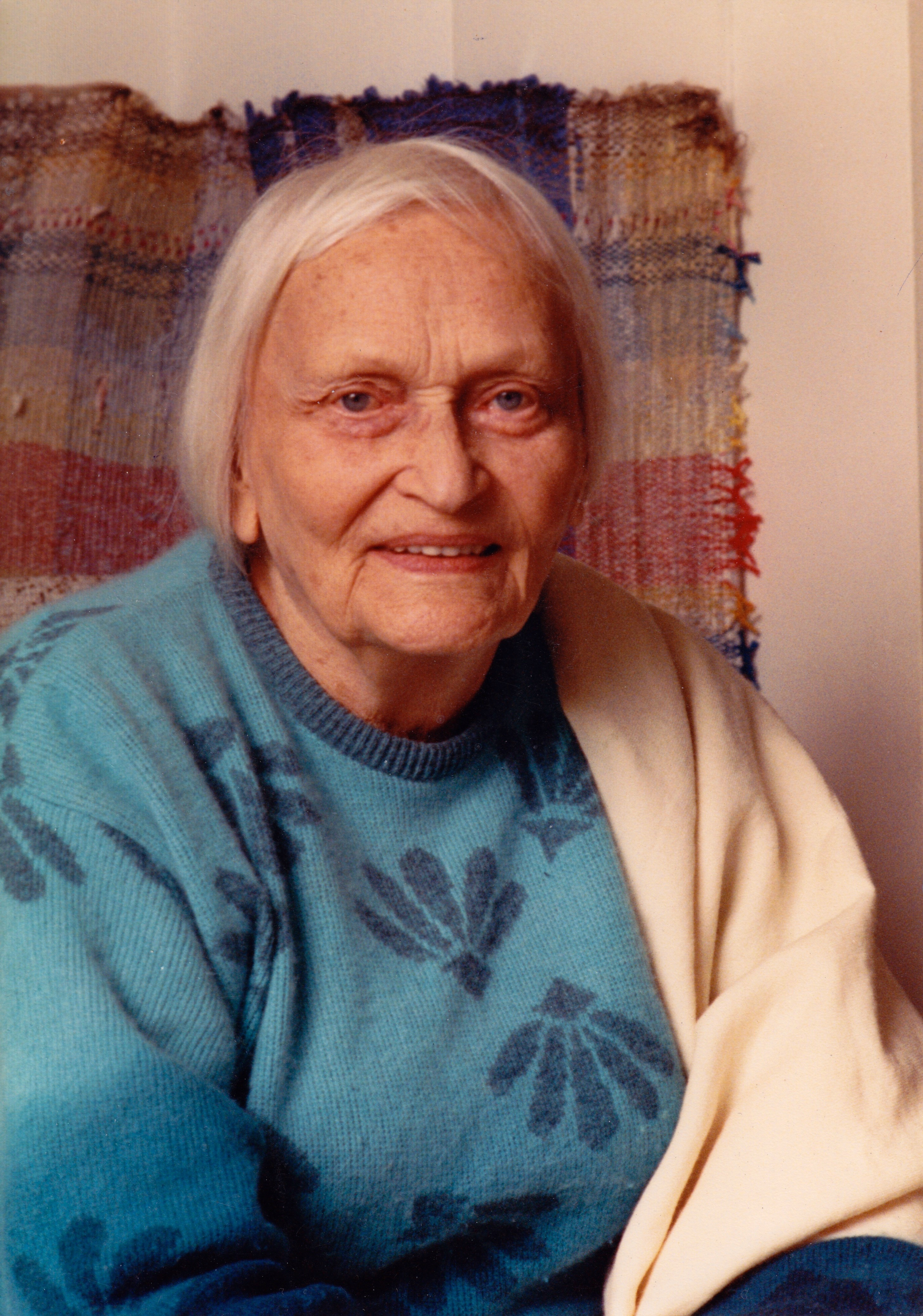
- Born: 20 April 1907; Russia
- Died: 23 August 1999 (aged 92)
- Occupations: Sufi, teacher
- Known for: Teaching and practicing Sufism, author of "Daughter of Fire: A Diary of a Spiritual Training with a Sufi Master"
- Spouse: English Navy officer surnamed Tweedie (m. 1946–1954)

Irina Tweedie (20 April 1907, Russia – 23 August 1999) was a Russian-British Sufi and teacher of the Naqshbandiyya-Mujaddidiya order.

Born as Irina Tamara Karpova (Ирина Тамара Ка́рпов) in Russia, she spent her early life in Austria, Switzerland, Italy, France and England after her family fled the Bolscheviks. She studied in Vienna and Paris, and after World War II married her second husband, an English Navy officer surnamed Tweedie.

Due to her second husband's premature death in 1954, she went through a personal crisis that launched her on a spiritual quest. She became an active member of the Theosophical Society and eventually she travelled to India in 1959. On 2 October 1961, through her friend Lilian Silburn (1908-1993), a Sanskrit scholar and translator at the Sorbonne, she met her guru, Radha Mohan Lal (1900-1966), a Sufi sheikh from the Naqshbandiyya-Mujadiddiya order, living in Kanpur, where she subsequently became one of the first Western women trained in the Naqshbandi system.

Her teacher's first request of her was to keep a complete diary of her spiritual training—everything, all the difficult parts, even all the doubts. He predicted that one day it would become a book and would benefit people around the world. Indeed, it became the book, Daughter of Fire: A Diary of a Spiritual Training with a Sufi Master.

This diary spans five years. It is an account of a spiritual training with a Sufi Master and is the most detailed account of the relationship between disciple and teacher that exists in Western Literature. From a psychological viewpoint, the diary maps the process of ego dissolution, gradually unveiling the openness and love that reside beneath the surface of the personality.

The book was first published in its abridged form as The Chasm of Fire which has sold over 100,000 copies and has been translated into five languages. A year later the unabridged book, Daughter of Fire: A Diary of a Spiritual Training with a Sufi Master, was published. This title has sold over 40,000 copies worldwide and is published through The Golden Sufi Center.

After her guru's death in 1966, she returned to England, where she started a Sufi meditation group in North London. Gradually the group spread throughout Europe and North America. In the late 1980s and early 1990s, Irina Tweedie travelled to Germany, Switzerland and Austria to give lectures that were subsequently translated from German into English and published as The Empty Bell series by Harvey L. Stahl and his team. Irina Tweedie retired in 1992 after having named Llewellyn Vaughan-Lee as her successor. She died in 1999, aged 92.

== Bibliography ==
- Daughter of Fire: A Diary of a Spiritual Training With a Sufi Master. ISBN 978-0-9634574-5-5, The Golden Sufi Center, 1986.
- The Chasm of Fire: A Woman's Experience With the Teachings of a Sufi Master. ISBN 978-1852300401, Element Books, 1985.
