= Sarah McFarland Taylor =

American academic and author

- Citizenship: U.S.
- Education: Brown University; Dartmouth College; University of California, Santa Barbara
- Occupations: Professor, author, environmental writer, media analyst
- Writing career
- Language: English
- Subjects: Media Studies, Environment, Climate, Religion & Culture
- Notable works: Green Sisters: A Spiritual Ecology; Ecopiety: Green Media and the Dilemma of Environmental Virtue
- Notable awards: Joseph H. Fichter Award; Albert C. Clarke Prize; Society for the Scientific Study of Religion research award

Sarah McFarland Taylor is an American academic and author. She is currently Associate Professor of Religion in the Department of Religious Studies at Northwestern University, where she also teaches in the Environmental Policy and Culture Program and in American Studies. Areas of research focus include studies of media, religion, and culture; public moral engagement in environmental issues; and consumerism, marketing, and popular culture. She holds a Bachelor's degree from Brown University, a Master's degree from Dartmouth College, and a doctorate in Religion and American Culture from the University of California, Santa Barbara. As of 2019, she earned an additional advanced degree in “Media History, Philosophy, and Criticism” from the Graduate School of Media Studies at The New School for Public Engagement.

Taylor has held numerous fellowships, including the Andrew W. Mellon Foundation Postdoctoral Fellowship, a Woodrow Wilson National Fellowship Foundation Career Enhancement Fellowship, a Rockefeller Foundation Humanities Fellowship, a Wabash Center Fellowship, and a Louisville Institute Fellowship. For the 2008-2009 school year, she held the Senior Research Fellowship at the Martin Marty Center for the Advanced Study of Religion at the University of Chicago Divinity School. Taylor is currently a member of University of Colorado at Boulder’s Center for the Study of Media, Religion, and Culture’s “Public Religion and Public Scholarship in the Digital Age” working group. <https://www.colorado.edu/cmrc/public-religion-project/interdisciplinary-working-group-members-1>

Her 2007 book Green Sisters: A Spiritual Ecology won two awards from the Catholic Press Association for Best Book on Gender Issues as well as Best Book on Social Concerns. Published by the Harvard University press, Green Sisters highlights Roman Catholic religious sisters who have taken up environmental activism, including the Dominican Sisters' Genesis Farm, the Green Mountain Monastery, White Violet Center for Eco-Justice of the Sisters of Providence of Saint Mary-of-the-Woods, and the Sisters of the Presentation straw-bale welcome center.

In "What If Religions Had Ecologies?: The Case for Reinhabiting Religious Studies" (Journal for the Study of Religion, Nature and Culture, Summer 2007), Taylor argues that meaningful connections need to be forged between the literary realm of ecocriticism and religious studies, and more attention needs to be paid to the natural history of the physical environments that religious communities inhabit and to how those communities shape and are in turn shaped by those environments. When physical environments are considered as integral parts of academic religious inquiry and no longer rendered invisible or relegated to mere ‘backdrops’ for the larger human drama, contends Taylor, scholars will be able to provide a more nuanced sense of religion as it is truly lived in context. Taylor continues to theorize the concept of "spiritual ecology" in her work.

Taylor’s most recent book is ECOPIETY: Green Media and the Dilemma of Environmental Virtue (NYU Press, October 2019). Taylor makes the case that a detailed, multi-channel, cross-platform approach to cultural analysis is critical to understanding the kind of important “work” taking place as mediated popular culture plays an integral role in the “greening” of American moral sensibilities. Ecopiety delves into the complex and contested processes of remaking our world and rescripting the future in the digital age—a time when storytelling processes themselves are shaping and being shaped by new media outlets and digital sharing technologies.

Exploring the power of story and mediamaking to shift social energetics and effect social transformation, the author challenges mediated stories of dour and individualized ecopiety. This book in turn highlights media interventions that interrupt narratives of ecopiety and “restory the earth,” while engendering the power of collective action, civic engagement, delight and play.

Taylor’s most recent research and writing project is called No Planet B: Marketing Mars and Manifest Destiny and juxtaposes the marketing of Mars colonization with environmental activist "No Planet B" media messaging, examining the implications of both for imagined planetary and extra-planetary futures.

== Works ==
- Green Sisters: A Spiritual Ecology (2007) ISBN 0-674-02440-0
- "Shopping and Consumption" <https://www.religious-studies.northwestern.edu/documents/Religion,%20Media,%20Popular%20Culture%20-%20Shopping%20andConsumption-Sarah%20McFarland%20Taylor.pdf>
- "Shopping, Religion, and the Sacred 'Buyosphere" in Religion and Popular Culture in America, 3rd Edition ISBN 9780520291461
- Ecopiety: Green Media and the Dilemma of Environmental Virtue, https://nyupress.org/9781479891313/ecopiety/
