= Dennis Morgan (American football) =

American football player (1952–2015)

No. 37, 42
- Position: Running back

Personal information
- Born: June 26, 1952; White Plains, New York, U.S.
- Died: October 25, 2015 (aged 63); East Rutherford, New Jersey, U.S.
- Listed height: 5 ft 11 in (1.80 m)
- Listed weight: 200 lb (91 kg)

Career information
- High school: White Plains Senior (NY)
- College: Western Illinois
- NFL draft: 1974: 10th round, 255th overall pick

Career history
- Dallas Cowboys (1974); Philadelphia Eagles (1975)

Career NFL statistics
- Games played: 17
- Stats at Pro Football Reference

Dennis Morgan (June 26, 1952 – October 25, 2015) was an American professional football running back in the National Football League (NFL) for the Dallas Cowboys and Philadelphia Eagles. He played college football at Western Illinois University.

== Early life ==
Morgan, grew up in White Plains, New York and attended White Plains Senior High School. He was a part of the 1969 undefeated football team.

He also lettered in track and baseball. He set the high school national record for the indoor 40-yard dash at 4.3 seconds.

== College career ==
Morgan attended Bradley University, where he was named the starter at running back as a freshman. The next year, he transferred to Western Illinois University after Bradley dropped its football program. He played running back and returned kickoffs for three seasons for Western Illinois.

As a junior, he averaged more than 30 yards per kickoff return. As a senior, he averaged almost 20 yards per punt return. He finished his college career with 1,254 rushing yards and a 4.7-yard average per carry. He received honorable-mention NAIA All-American honors in 1972.

== Professional career ==
=== Dallas Cowboys ===
Morgan was selected by the Dallas Cowboys in the tenth round (255th overall) of the 1974 NFL draft. Known as "Strawberry" due to his red hair, he started off playing on special teams.

As a rookie, he tied the longest punt return in NFL history with a 98-yard touchdown (also a franchise record) against the St. Louis Cardinals. That season, he finished third in the NFL in punt return average with 15.1 yards and led the team in both punt return yards (287) and kickoff return yards (823).

Morgan was waived on August 4, 1975.

=== Philadelphia Eagles ===
On August 6, 1975, Morgan was claimed off waivers by the Philadelphia Eagles. He played in four games, registering 170 yards (24.3 average) on kickoff returns and 60 yards (7.5 average) on punt returns. He was released on October 17.

== Personal life ==
Morgan served in the United States Army after football. He died on October 25, 2015, after suffering a heart attack while attending the New York Giants vs. Dallas Cowboys game at MetLife Stadium.
