= John Allen Grim =

American academic (born 1946)

John Allen Grim (born October 7, 1946) is an American academic and author. He is the co-founder and co-director of the Yale Forum on Religion and Ecology, alongside his wife Mary Evelyn Tucker. He teaches at Yale University, where he holds appointments in the Yale School of the Environment, the Divinity School, and the Department of Religious Studies. He has also taught at Sarah Lawrence College and Bucknell University. Grim specializes in Native American religions and has studied the Salish people of Washington State and the Crow/Apsaalooke people of Montana. He has also undertaken field work with healing practitioners in East and Southeast Asia and with religious leaders in Vrindaban and New Delhi, India.

Grim teaches in the joint MA program in religion and ecology at Yale and offers courses in world religions and ecology and Native American and Indigenous traditions. He teaches hybrid/online classes at Yale as well as two massive open online course specializations: one specialization with three courses on "Journey of the Universe" and "The Worldview of Thomas Berry" and another with five courses on "Religions and Ecology", plus a single course on "Christianity and Ecology".

== Works ==
Grim is the author of The Shaman and the co-author of Ecology and Religion. He has also edited and co-edited numerous volumes including Living Cosmology, the Routledge Handbook of Religion and Ecology, Worldviews and Ecology, and Indigenous Traditions and Ecology, among others.

=== Collaborations with Thomas Berry ===
Grim studied world religions with Thomas Berry in graduate school and worked closely with him for more than 40 years. He co-edited several of his books including The Christian Future and the Fate of Earth and Selected Writings on the Earth Community Grim and his wife Mary Evelyn Tucker are managing trustees of the Thomas Berry Foundation. In 2019, Tucker, Grim, and Andrew Angyal published Thomas Berry: A Biography.

=== Forum on Religion and Ecology ===
Grim is co-founder and co-director of the Yale Forum on Religion and Ecology. From 1995 to 1998 Grim and Tucker organized a series of ten conferences on World Religions and Ecology at the Center for the Study of World Religions at Harvard University. They are the series editors for the ten volumes (distributed by Harvard University Press) that came out of the conferences. At a culminating conference at the United Nations in 1998, they founded the Forum on Religion and Ecology. Speaking at that event were Tim Wirth, Tu Weiming, Maurice Strong, and Bill Moyers.

Grim also frequently speaks and gives interviews on religion and ecology and issues of ecological importance, such as Laudato si' (the Papal Encyclical on the environment) and Standing Rock/DAPL.

=== Journey of the Universe ===
Grim is an executive producer for Journey of the Universe (2011), an award-winning documentary. This documentary aired on PBS for a number of years and is part of a multimedia project that also includes a series of conversations with scientists and environmentalists on DVD and podcasts, and a book written by Brian Thomas Swimme and Mary Evelyn Tucker.

=== American Teilhard Association ===
Since 1996, Grim has served as president of the American Teilhard Association. The association is dedicated to the work and legacy of French paleontologist, philosopher, and Jesuit, Pierre Teilhard de Chardin.

== Education ==
Grim earned his B.A. in theology and history from St. John's University (Minnesota) (1968), and his M.A. and Ph.D. in history or religion from Fordham University (1975).

== Awards ==
Among the awards Grim has received are the Lifetime Achievement Award in religion and ecology, the Interfaith Visionary Award in 2010, the Chancellor's Medal/Joint and Common Future Award (University of Massachusetts, Boston) in 2013, and the Passionist Award for promoting Thomas Berry's work in 2016.

He was awarded honorary doctorates from California Institute of Integral Studies (2005) and St. John's University (Minnesota) (2011).

== Major publications ==
- Mickey, Sam, Mary Evelyn Tucker, and John Grim, eds. Living Earth Community: Multiple Ways of Being and Knowing. Cambridge, U.K.: Open Book Publishers, 2020.
- Tucker, Mary Evelyn, John Grim, and Andrew Angyal. Thomas Berry: A Biography. Columbia University Press, 2019.
- Jenkins, Willis, Mary Evelyn Tucker, and John Grim, eds. Routledge Handbook on Religion and Ecology. New York, NY: Routledge Books, 2017.
- Tucker, Mary Evelyn and John Grim, eds. Living Cosmology: Christian Responses to Journey of the Universe. Maryknoll, NY: Orbis Books, 2016.
- Tucker, Mary Evelyn and John Grim. "Integrating Ecology and Justice: The Papal Encyclical." The Quarterly Review of Biology 91, no. 3 (2016): 261–270.
- Berry, Thomas. Selected Writings on the Earth Community. Selected and with an introduction by Mary Evelyn Tucker and John Grim. Spiritual Masters Series. Maryknoll, NY: Orbis Books, 2014.
- Grim, John and Mary Evelyn Tucker. Ecology and Religion. Washington, D.C.: Island Press, 2014.
- Tucker, Mary Evelyn and John Grim, eds. The Christian Future and the Fate of Earth: Collected Essays of Thomas Berry. Maryknoll, NY: Orbis Books, 2009.
- Grim, John, ed. Indigenous Traditions and Ecology: The Interbeing of Cosmology and Community. Cambridge, MA: Harvard University Press for CSWR series World Religions and Ecology, 2001.
- Tucker, Mary Evelyn and John Grim, eds. "Religion and Ecology: Can the Climate Change?" Daedalus, American Academy of Arts and Sciences, Cambridge, MA, Fall 2001.
- Tucker, Mary Evelyn and John Grim, eds. Worldviews and Ecology: Religion, Philosophy, and the Environment. Lewisburg, PA: Bucknell University Press, 1993, paperback edition Orbis Books, 1994. (Eighth printing 2003, Translated into Indonesian).
- Grim, John, ed. Shamans and Preachers, Color Symbolism and Commercial Evangelism: Reflections on Early Mid-Atlantic Religious Encounter in Light of the Columbian Quincentennial. Special Issue American Indian Quarterly. University of Nebraska Press, Fall 1992, Volume XVI, Number 4.
- Grim, John. The Shaman, Patterns of Siberian and Ojibway Healing, The Civilization of the American Indian Series #165, Norman: University of Oklahoma Press, 1983; paper back, 1984; reprinted in 1987 as The Shaman, Patterns of Religious Healing Among the Ojibway Indians. French translation, 1985.
