= White Plains High School =

High school in Westchester County, NY, US

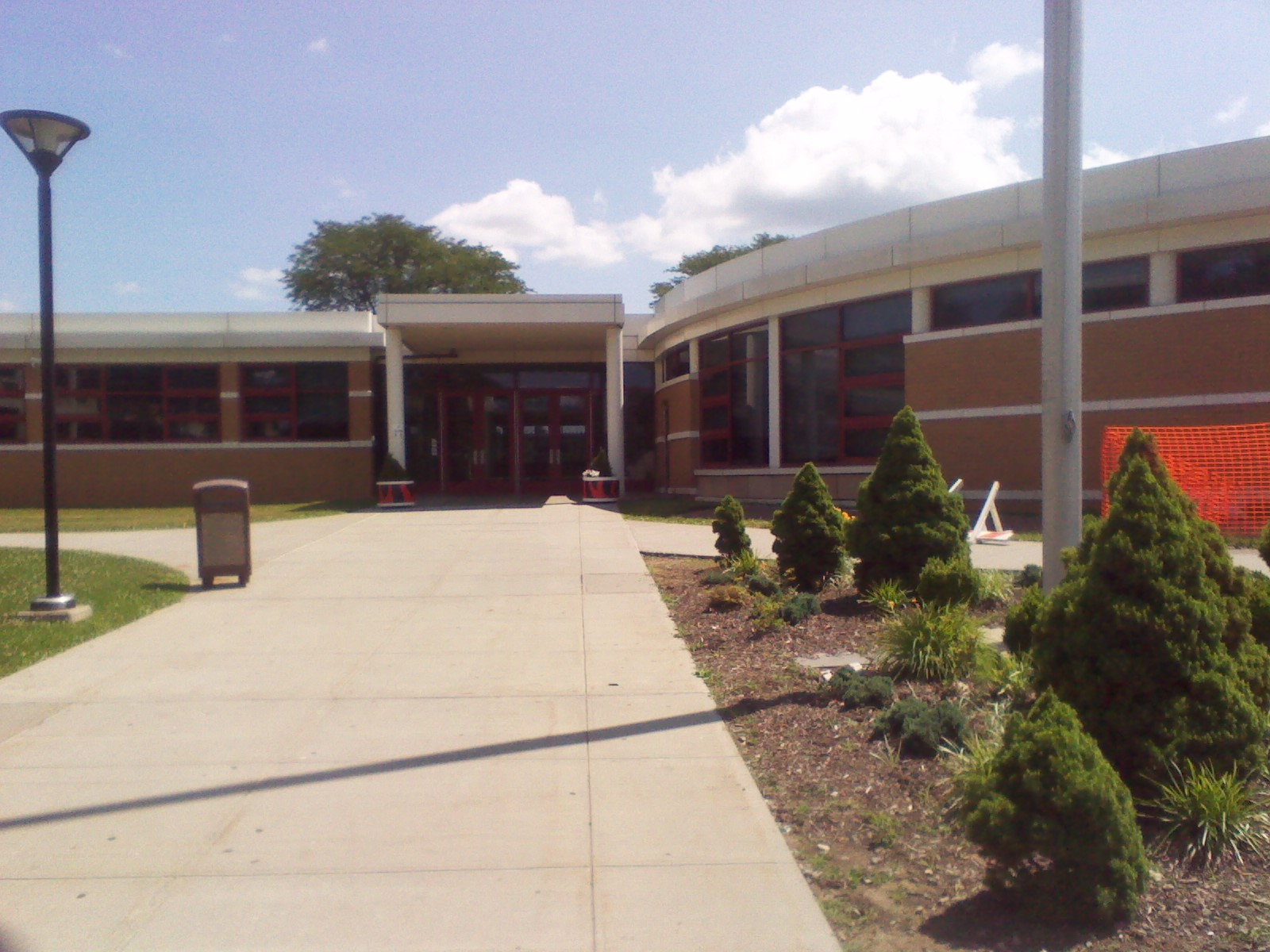

Location
- 550 North Street; White Plains, Westchester County, New York 10605; United States; 41.02005°N 73.73777°W

Information
- Type: Public
- Established: 1962
- School district: White Plains Public Schools
- Superintendent: Dr. Maya Amir Ed.D
- NCES School ID: 363126004188
- Principal: Emerly A. Martinez
- Faculty: 171.5 FTEs
- Grades: 9 – 12
- Age range: 13-19
- Enrollment: 2,221 (as of 2023–24)
- Average class size: 30
- Student to teacher ratio: 13.0:1
- Campus size: 75 acres
- Houses: North, East, and South Houses
- Colors: Orange & black
- Slogan: Pls Study
- Athletics: Section 1 (NYSPHSAA)
- Sports: Football
- Mascot: Tiger
- Rival: Every county in Westchester
- Newspaper: The Orange
- Yearbook: The Oracle
- Phone number: (914) 422-2182
- Graduation rate: 78%(as of 2026-2027)
- Website: https://hs.whiteplainspublicschools.org/

White Plains High School is a high school in the White Plains Public Schools system of White Plains, New York, United States. Built in 1962, it sits on 75 acres and has been expanded. It was selected by the U.S. Department of Education as a School of Excellence in 1986–1987.

== Demographics ==
As of the 2023–24 school year, the school had an enrollment of 2,221 students and 171.5 classroom teachers (on an FTE basis), for a student–teacher ratio of 13.0:1. There were 1,202 students (54.1% of enrollment) eligible for free lunch and 84 (3.8% of students) eligible for reduced-cost lunch.

== Publications ==
- Yearbook: The Oracle
- Newspaper: The Orange
- Literary magazine: The Roar

== Athletics ==
The school makes available for its students two gymnasiums, a weight room, a track field and football field (Loucks Field), a soccer field, baseball and softball fields, tennis courts, and a pool.

- White Plains football team won the Section 1 Class AA title in 2013 for the first time in 34 years.

== Notable alumni ==
Notable inductees into the White Plains High School Hall of Fame include:

- T. Alexander Aleinikoff (1970) – United Nations Deputy High Commissioner for Refugees
- David Corn (1977) – author and broadcast journalist
- John Davidson (1959) – versatile singer, actor and entertainer with career spanning more than 55 years, including Broadway musicals, Disney movies, variety, game and talk shows on TV and Las Vegas showrooms
- Robert Malcolm Graham (1963) – Massachusetts State Supreme Court Justice
- Lawrence Otis Graham (1979) – author, attorney and broadcast commentator
- Larry James (1966) – Olympic medal winner
- James J. Jordan (1948) – advertising executive and copywriter (posthumous award)
- Grover "Deacon" Jones (1952) – Major League Baseball player and coach
- Philip Kent (1972) – CEO of Turner Broadcasting System, Inc.
- Jonathan Larson (1978) – Pulitzer Prize-Winning playwright, Rent (posthumous award)
- J. Bruce Llewellyn (1945) – business and civic leader
- Dave Marash (1959) – broadcast journalist
- Craig Masback (1973) – track champion, sports broadcaster, CEO of USA Track & Field
- Art Monk (1976) – NFL wide receiver, Pro Football Hall of Fame inductee
- Oscar Moore (1956) – U.S. Olympian runner, honored college track & field coach
- Garrick Ohlsson (1966) – international concert pianist
- Jimmy Roberts (1975) – Emmy Award-winning sports journalist and broadcaster
- John Jay Saldi IV (1972) – football player; played more than 100 games over nine seasons in the National Football League for the Dallas Cowboys and the Chicago Bears; key member of Dallas' Super Bowl Champion (XII) team
- David E. Sanger (1978) – Pulitzer Prize-winning journalist, White House Correspondent for The New York Times
- Richard Schlesinger (1972) – broadcast journalist

Other notable alumni include:

- Sam Bowers – football player
- Lynn Conway (class of 1955) – computer scientist and transgender rights activist
- David Corn – political journalist and author
- Sloane Crosley – author
- Jennifer Damiano – Broadway actress
- Dan Duryea (class of 1924) – film and television actor
- Roger S. Gottlieb - philosopher and environmentalist
- Mal Graham – basketball player, 11th overall pick of 1967 NBA draft
- Martha Himmelfarb – scholar of religion and long-time professor at Princeton University
- Larry James – Olympic gold medalist track athlete
- Grover "Deacon" Jones – retired first baseman for Chicago White Sox
- Sean Kilpatrick – basketball player for Brooklyn Nets and for Hapoel Jerusalem of the Israeli Basketball Super League
- Jonathan Larson – playwright and composer, best known for creating musical Rent
- Lou Mark – football player
- Matisyahu – Hasidic Jewish reggae musician
- Arthur Monk – NFL wide receiver, Pro Football Hall of Fame
- Dennis Morgan – NFL football player
- Frank Navarro – football player and coach
- Dick Nolan – football player
- Garrick Ohlsson – classical pianist
- Lawrence Otis Graham – attorney, journalist, and author
- Gordon Parks Jr. – film director of Super Fly, son of photographer Gordon Parks Sr.
- Louise Reiss (1920–2011), physician who coordinated what became known as the Baby Tooth Survey, which found Strontium-90 in the deciduous teeth of children living in the St. Louis area
- Jay Saldi – NFL tight end, Super Bowl champion (Super Bowl X)
- David E. Sanger – White House correspondent for The New York Times
- Andrew S. Tanenbaum – computer scientist
- Chris Watson – American-Israeli basketball player
- Claire Weinstein - Olympic silver medalist freestyle swimmer.
- Sal Yvars – MLB baseball player

== In film ==
Scenes from The Beaver, a film directed by Jodie Foster and starring Mel Gibson and Foster, were filmed at the high school in the fall of 2009. Scenes from the film Win Win, starring Paul Giamatti, were shot at the high school in March 2010. Scenes from Alex Strangelove, a film written and directed by Craig Johnson, were also filmed at the high school in the summer of 2017.
