= Mary Evelyn Tucker =

American theologist and ecologist

Mary Evelyn Tucker is an American academic and author. She is the co-founder and co-director of the Yale Forum on Religion and Ecology with her husband, John Allen Grim. Tucker teaches in the joint Master's program in religion and ecology at Yale University between the School of the Environment, and the Divinity School. She also has an appointment at Yale's Department of Religious Studies. A pioneer in the field of religion and ecology, she has authored and edited around 20 volumes and has published hundreds of articles.

She teaches a massive open online course (MOOC) specialization of three courses on "Journey of the Universe" and "The Worldview of Thomas Berry" plus a MOOC specialization of five courses on "Religions and Ecology" and a course on "Christianity and Ecology".

== Early life and education ==
Mary Evelyn Tucker was born in New York City, the daughter of William D. Tucker, Jr. and Mary Elizabeth Hayes Tucker, and the granddaughter of Carlton J. H. Hayes, noted European historian at Columbia University and Ambassador to Spain in WWII under Franklin Delano Roosevelt. She has a B.A. in English from Trinity College (1971) (now known as Trinity Washington University) and a master's degree from State University of New York at Fredonia in English (1972). She also studied literature and history at Oxford University during her sophomore year. After teaching for two years at Notre Dame University in Japan and studying at Sophia University in Tokyo she received an M.A. from Fordham University in History of Religions (1977). Her Ph.D. is in Asian religions from Columbia University (1985) where she specialized in Confucianism in China and Japan. She has published five books on Confucianism. She has been an Associate in Research at the Edwin O. Reischauer Institute of Japanese Studies at Harvard University since 1997.

== Career ==
=== Work with Thomas Berry ===
Tucker studied world religions in graduate school with noted cultural historian Thomas Berry (known for books such as his 1988 volume, The Dream of the Earth, originally published by Sierra Club Books). She worked closely with Berry for 35 years and has edited a number of his books including The Great Work, Evening Thoughts, The Sacred Universe, Christian Future and The Fate of Earth, and Selected Writings on the Earth Community. She and her husband John Grim together carry on the legacy of Thomas Berry through their work in religion and ecology and the Journey of the Universe. They are managing trustees of the Thomas Berry Foundation. In 2019, Tucker, Grim, and Andrew Angyal published Thomas Berry: A Biography. That same year, Tucker co-organized a conference titled "Thomas Berry and the 'Great Work'" at the Berkley Center for Religion, Peace, and World Affairs at Georgetown University.

=== The Forum on Religion and Ecology ===
With the vision of creating a new field of study that could have implications for environmental policy, Tucker and Grim organized a series of ten conferences on World Religions and Ecology at the Center for the Study of World Religions at Harvard University (1995–1998). Ten volumes came out of the conferences (series editors: Tucker and Grim) and are distributed by Harvard University Press. After the conferences, she and Grim founded the Forum on Religion and Ecology at a culminating event at the United Nations and American Museum of Natural History in 1998, which featured such notables as Maurice Strong, Bill Moyers, Tim Wirth, and Tu Weiming.

The Forum has organized dozens of conferences, published numerous volumes, and produced a comprehensive website on world religions and ecology. The Forum is inherently interdisciplinary and acknowledges that the world's religions must engage with other key disciplines (e.g., public policy, science, education, economics) in order to find answers to contemporary environmental challenges.

Twenty years ago the field of religion and ecology did not exist. Today there are courses taught at colleges and secondary schools across North America, Europe, and Australia, and a surge of religious environmentalism has emerged globally in churches, temples, synagogues, and mosques. Statements have been issued by every major religion regarding the importance of environmental protection. The Forum on Religion and Ecology has been an integral part of these worldwide developments. To this end Tucker has spoken at conferences around the world, including the International Union for Conservation of Nature (IUCN), the United Nations Environment Programme (UNEP), the Vatican Pontifical Council for Justice and Peace, the Potsdam Institute for Climate Impact Research, the Global Forum, Earth Charter International Conferences, and the Parliament of World Religions.

=== Journey of the Universe ===
With evolutionary philosopher Brian Thomas Swimme, Mary Evelyn Tucker created Journey of the Universe, a multi-media project that carries forward much of Berry's work. The project includes the Journey of the Universe film, which won a Northern California Emmy Award for "Outstanding Achievement: Documentary" and aired on PBS stations across the U.S. for three years. The Journey film was directed by David Kennard (one of the directors and senior producers of Carl Sagan's Cosmos and Jacob Bronowski's Ascent of Man) and Patsy Northcutt. There is also a book by the same name from Yale University Press and a series of 20 conversations on DVD and podcasts—interviews conducted by Tucker with leading environmentalists, scientists, educators, and historians.

Journey was inspired by Thomas Berry's 1978 essay "The New Story", which looked at how humanity is in between stories—the religious creation stories and the scientific story of the evolution. Tucker and Swimme came together to craft this epic narrative designed to communicate our intricate connection to the cosmos and Earth to a broader audience.

The Journey film was the winner of Best Documentary at the Northern California Emmy Awards (2011–2012); winner of the Global Award and received Merit awards for both Scientific Information and Cinematography at the Montana CINE International Film Festival (2012); winner of the Sierra Nevada Award at the Mountain Film Festival; winner of the El Capitan Award at the Yosemite International Film Festival; chosen as one of the featured films at the Environmental Film Festival in the Nation's Capital; an official selection at the Wild and Scenic Film Festival; received an Honorable Mention at the Columbus International Film Festival; and received the Award of Excellence at the Indie Fest.

== Service ==
Tucker has been an integral part of the Earth Charter since its initial inception. From 1997–2000, she served on the International Earth Charter Drafting Committee, chaired by Steven Rockefeller, and she was also a member of the Earth Charter International Council. She currently serves on the advisory boards of Orion magazine, the Garrison Institute, Woodwell Climate Research Center, and Green Belt Movement U.S., dedicated to the work and legacy of Wangari Maathai. From 1979–2020, Tucker served as vice-president of the American Teilhard Association, dedicated to the legacy of scientist and philosopher Pierre Teilhard deChardin. Since 2017, Tucker has served as a member of the Global Steering Committee for the Interfaith Rainforest Initiative, UNEP. Additionally, she currently sits on the Advisory Committee for Global Earth Optimism, Smithsonian Institution and is a member of the Standing Commission on Nurturing a Sustainable Environment, Religions for Peace. Tucker is a member of the Ecology Working Group of the Vatican Covid-19 Commission of the Dicastery for Promoting Human Development.

== Awards and recognition ==
Mary Evelyn Tucker has been a recipient of the Lifetime Achievement Award in religion and ecology from the International Society for the Study of Religion, Nature and Culture (ISSRNC), the Inspiring Yale Teaching Award, the Thomas Berry Award, the Chancellor's Medal/Joint and Common Future Award (University of Massachusetts, Boston), the Unitas Distinguished Alumna Award (Union Theological Seminary), the Interfaith Visionary Award, the Faith in Action Award, the Hudson Valley Hero Award, Spiritearth Award, Centennial Alumnae Award for Academic Excellence (Trinity College), among others.

She was awarded honorary degrees from Trinity Washington University (2022), Iona University (2022), Hebrew College (2019), Rosemont College (2014) St. Michael's College (Toronto) (2012), Queen's University at Kingston (2012), and California Institute of Integral Studies (2005).

== Personal life ==
Mary Evelyn Tucker is married to Yale professor John Grim, an expert on Native American traditions and author of The Shaman. They live in Connecticut.

== Selected publications ==
- Mickey, Sam, Mary Evelyn Tucker, and John Grim, eds. Living Earth Community: Multiple Ways of Being and Knowing. Cambridge, U.K.: Open Book Publishers, 2020.
- Tucker, Mary Evelyn, John Grim, and Andrew Angyal. Thomas Berry: A Biography. Columbia University Press, 2019.
- Jenkins, Willis, Mary Evelyn Tucker, and John Grim, eds. Routledge Handbook on Religion and Ecology. New York, NY: Routledge Books, 2016.
- Tucker, Mary Evelyn and John Grim, eds. Living Cosmology: Christian Responses to Journey of the Universe. Maryknoll, NY: Orbis Books, 2016.
- Tucker, Mary Evelyn and John Grim. "Integrating Ecology and Justice: The Papal Encyclical." The Quarterly Review of Biology 91, no. 3 (2016): 261–270.
- Living Cosmology: Christian Responses to Journey of the Universe. Maryknoll, NY: Orbis Books, 2016.
- Tucker, Mary Evelyn and John Grim, eds. Thomas Berry: Selected Writings on the Earth Community. (Spiritual Masters Series.) Maryknoll, NY: Orbis Books, 2014.
- John Grim and Mary Evelyn Tucker. Ecology and Religion. Washington, D.C.: Island Press, 2014.
- Brian Thomas Swimme and Mary Evelyn Tucker. Journey of the Universe. New Haven and London: Yale University Press, 2011.
- Tucker, Mary Evelyn, ed. The Sacred Universe: Earth, Spirituality, and Religion in the 21st Century. Essays by Thomas Berry. New York: Columbia University Press, 2009.
- Tucker, Mary Evelyn and John Grim, eds. Christian Future and the Fate of Earth. Essays by Thomas Berry. Maryknoll, NY: Orbis Books, 2009.
- Tucker, Mary Evelyn. The Philosophy of Qi: The Record of Great Doubts. New York: Columbia University Press, 2007.
- Tucker, Mary Evelyn, ed. Evening Thoughts: Reflecting on Earth as Sacred Community. Essays by Thomas Berry. Berkeley: Counterpoint Press, 2015. Originally San Francisco: Sierra Club Books and Berkeley: University of California Press, 2006.
- Tucker, Mary Evelyn. Worldly Wonder: Religions Enter Their Ecological Phase. Chicago: Open Court, 2003. Second printing, 2004.
- Tucker, Mary Evelyn and Tu Weiming, eds. Confucian Spirituality, 2 volumes. New York: Crossroad Publishing Company, Volume I, 2003, Volume II, 2004.
- Tucker, Mary Evelyn, Cliff Matthews, and Philip Hefner, eds. When Worlds Converge: What Science and Religion Tell Us about the Story of the Universe and Our Place in It. Chicago: Open Court, 2002.
- Tucker, Mary Evelyn and John Grim, eds. "Religion and Ecology: Can the Climate Change?" Daedalus. Vol. 130, No. 4, Cambridge, Mass.: American Academy of Arts and Sciences, 2001.
- Tucker, Mary Evelyn and Christopher Chapple, eds. Hinduism and Ecology: The Intersection of Earth, Sky, and Water. Cambridge, Mass.: Center for the Study of World Religions and Harvard University Press, 2000.
- Tucker, Mary Evelyn and John Berthrong, eds. Confucianism and Ecology: The Interrelation of Heaven, Earth, and Humans. Cambridge, Mass.: Center for the Study of World Religions and Harvard University Press, 1998.
- Tucker, Mary Evelyn and Duncan Williams, eds. Buddhism and Ecology: The Interaction of Dharma and Deeds. Cambridge, Mass.: Center for the Study of World Religions and Harvard University Press, 1997.
- Tucker, Mary Evelyn and John Grim, eds. Worldviews and Ecology: Religion, Philosophy and the Environment. Lewisburg, Pa.: Bucknell University Press, 1993, Paperback edition, Orbis Books, 1994. (Eighth printing 2003). Translated into Indonesian.
- Tucker, Mary Evelyn. Moral and Spiritual Cultivation in Japanese Neo-Confucianism: The Life and Thought of Kaibara Ekken (1630–1714), Albany, N.Y.: SUNY Press, 1989.
- From home to cosmos
