= Yale Forum on Religion and Ecology =

Interdisciplinary project in Yale University

The Yale Forum on Religion and Ecology is a multireligious and interdisciplinary project founded in 1998 and based at Yale University since 2006. Since 2023, it has operated under the auspices of the Yale Center for Environmental Justice (YCEJ). In collaboration with other academics and environmentalists, it promotes the teaching and study of religion and ecology and highlights the activity of religious environmentalism around the globe. The Forum publishes books and articles, provides a monthly email newsletter, offers online Coursera courses, organizes conferences, and maintains a website emphasizing engaged scholarship and action for ecojustice.

== Origins ==
From 1996 to 1998, Forum founders and directors Mary Evelyn Tucker and John Grim organized the Harvard Religions of the World and Ecology conference series of 10 conferences at the Harvard Center for the Study of World Religions.

The culminating conferences were convened in October 1998 at the American Academy of Arts and Sciences in Cambridge, Massachusetts, and the American Museum of Natural History in New York City. A symposium and press conference was also held at the United Nations, at which the founding of the Forum on Religion and Ecology was publicly announced. As a result of the Harvard conferences, a series of books was published by the Harvard Center for the Study of World Religions from 1997 to 2004, with nine volumes available in English (the tenth, Shinto and Ecology, was released in Japanese).

The Forum is based on the work of 'geologian' and historian of religions Thomas Berry, known for his book The Dream of the Earth, originally published by Sierra Club Books. Tucker and Grim edited his published works, including The Great Work, Sacred Universe, Evening Thoughts, Christian Future and the Fate of Earth, and Selected Writings on the Earth Community. In addition, with Andrew Angyal they published Thomas Berry: A Biography (2019), the first biography of Berry. A series of rare audio recordings of Berry in conversation with evolutionary cosmologist Brian Thomas Swimme was released in October 2023. Titled “The Collected Thoughts of Thomas Berry,” these were made available in digital format for the first time in 2023 for the 25th anniversary of the Forum.

In conjunction with the Thomas Berry Foundation, the Forum also maintains a website dedicated to Berry's life work and legacy. Tucker and Grim also founded an archive of his papers at Harvard University in 1998, which his sister Margaret Berry developed, part of the Harvard Library Environmental Science and Public Policy Archives.

In the Winter 2022-2023 issue of Columbia Magazine, a comprehensive view of the field of religion and ecology was published, which featured in particular the work of the Forum and of the Center for Earth Ethics at Union Theological Seminary at Columbia University.

== Conferences ==
The Forum has hosted dozens of conferences around the world since the first Harvard conference in 1996, bringing together scholars of world religions, theologians, and ethicists with scientists, policymakers, environmentalists, and many more. Some of the most notable events include: Renewing Hope: Pathways of Religious Environmentalism; Living Cosmology: Christian Responses to Journey of the Universe; and Living Earth Community: Ways of Being and Knowing the World.

== Publications ==
The Forum and its founders have published many books and articles on the topic of religion and ecology over the past 25 years. Some of the highlights include: the ten volumes of the Harvard Religions of the World and Ecology series (Harvard CSWR/Harvard University Press, 1996–2001); the 2001 Daedalus volume, "Religion and Ecology: Can the Climate Change?"; the book Ecology and Religion (Island Press, 2014); "Integrating Ecology and Justice: the Papal Encyclical" (Quarterly Review of Biology, 2016); and Routledge Handbook of Religion and Ecology (Routledge, 2017). A full list of publications can be found on the Forum website.

== Online courses ==
The Forum has created two series of online courses, released through Yale University and the Coursera online learning platform.

In 2016, "Journey of the Universe: A Story for our Times" was released. This series contains 3 courses related to the Forum's sister project, the documentary film Journey of the Universe, and includes a class on Thomas Berry.

In 2022, "Religions and Ecology: Restoring the Earth Community" was released. This series includes 6 courses on religious traditions around the world and their relationship to the environment.

== Related projects, initiatives, and organizations ==
=== Journey of the Universe ===
This 2011 documentary film and multimedia project, created by Brian Thomas Swimme and Mary Evelyn Tucker, was the winner of the 2012 Northern California Emmy Award for Best Documentary. The project also includes:

- Journey of the Universe book from Yale University Press, 2011
- Journey Conversations, a series of interviews for streaming and on DVD, expanding on the themes of the film.
- Journey of the Universe: A Story for our Times series of online courses from Yale University and the Coursera online learning platform

=== Yale Center for Environmental Justice ===
In 2023, Tucker and Grim retired from teaching at Yale. At that time, the Forum entered into a new partnership with the Yale Center for Environmental Justice and now operates under the auspices of YCEJ. The Center, founded by environmental lawyer Gerald Torres, is a project of the Yale School of the Environment and Yale Law School, in partnership with the Yale College’s Center for the Study of Race, Indigeneity, and Transnational Migration.

=== Thomas Berry Foundation ===
Dedicated to continuing the work of Thomas Berry, the Thomas Berry Foundation (in conjunction with the Forum) distributes his books and arranges for translations. It maintains a website and presents the Thomas Berry Award to those who have contributed significantly to the flourishing of the Earth community. It helped to create the Thomas Berry archive at Harvard. This collection is part of the Harvard Library Environmental Science and Public Policy Archives (ESPPA).

=== Ecology and Justice book series ===
Since 1993, Forum directors Tucker and Grim have served as advisory board members for a collection of 28 volumes published by Orbis Books that bring together the themes of environmental justice with social justice.

=== UNEP Faith for Earth ===
A division of the United Nations Environment Programme, the organization educates and informs about caring for the Earth and help them in working towards the UN Sustainable Development Goals (SDGs). The Forum announced a formal partnership with Faith for Earth in 2020. In September that year, UNEP's Faith for Earth Initiative, in collaboration with the Parliament of the World's Religions, United Religions Initiative, and Bhumi Global, released a report on the activities of faith-based environmental initiatives around the globe, as defined by the SDGs. In 2021, the project was expanded to include a living database of current and future projects and organizations, which is housed on the Forum's website.

=== Worldviews: Global Religions, Culture, and Ecology ===
The first journal in this field, the Forum has supported Worldviews since its inception in 1996. Tucker and Grim have served as Associate Editors of the journal since its founding.

=== Involvement with the Earth Charter ===
The Earth Charter is a collaborative document composed over a decade, involving many stakeholders around the planet. It provides an ethical framework for the interwoven principles of ecology, justice, and peace. Tucker served on the Earth Charter drafting committee (1997–2000) and the Earth Charter International Council (2000–2013).

=== American Teilhard Association ===
Grim and Tucker served as president and vice-president of the American Teilhard Association for over 35 years. Both stepped down as officers in 2019. Thomas Berry served as President of the association from 1975 to 1986. French philosopher, paleontologist, and Jesuit priest, Pierre Teilhard deChardin (1881–1955), has been a major influence on the work of both Berry and the Forum.
