= Brian Swimme =

American cosmologist (born 1950)

Brian Thomas Swimme
- Born: 1950 (age 75–76); Seattle, Washington
- Education: Bellarmine College Preparatory; Santa Clara University; University of Oregon (PhD)
- Known for: evolutionary narrative of the universe (epic of evolution)
- Awards: Thomas Berry Award 1999
- Scientific career
- Workplaces: University of Puget Sound; California Institute of Integral Studies
- Doctoral advisor: Richard Barrar

Brian Thomas Swimme (born 1950) is a professor at the California Institute of Integral Studies, in San Francisco, where he teaches evolutionary cosmology to graduate students in the philosophy, cosmology, and consciousness program. He received his Ph.D. (1978) from the department of mathematics at the University of Oregon for work with Richard Barrar on singularity theory, with a dissertation titled Singularities in the N-Body Problem.

Swimme's published work portrays the 14-billion-year trajectory of cosmogenesis "as a spellbinding drama, full of suspense, valor, tragedy, and celebration". His work includes The Universe is a Green Dragon (1984), The Universe Story, written with Thomas Berry (1992), The Hidden Heart of the Cosmos (1996), and The Journey of the Universe, written with Mary Evelyn Tucker (2011). Swimme is the producer of three DVD series: Canticle to the Cosmos (1990), The Earth's Imagination (1998), and The Powers of the Universe (2004). Swimme teamed with Mary Evelyn Tucker, David Kennard, Patsy Northcutt, and Catherine Butler to produce Journey of the Universe, a Northern California Emmy-winning film released in 2011. These works draw together scientific discoveries in astronomy, geology and biology, with humanistic insights concerning the nature of the universe.

== Background ==
Swimme is an evolutionary cosmologist on the graduate faculty of the California Institute of Integral Studies in the philosophy, cosmology and consciousness and also ecology, spirituality, and religion programs, areas of study within the philosophy and religion program. Swimme's primary field of research is the nature of the evolutionary dynamics of the universe. He has developed an interpretation of the human as an emergent being within the universe and earth. His central concern is the role of the human within the earth community, the cultural implications of the epic of evolution, and the role of humanity in the unfolding story of earth and cosmos. Toward this goal, he founded the Center for the Story of the Universe.

Swimme was featured in the television series Soul of the Universe (The BBC, 1991) and The Sacred Balance produced by David Suzuki (CBC and PBS, 2003). He is the producer of a twelve-part DVD series Canticle to the Cosmos. Other DVD programs featuring Swimme's ideas include The Earth's Imagination and The Powers of the Universe.

Swimme founded the international Epic of Evolution Society in 1998. This was a result of his participation in the conference Dialogue on Science, Ethics, and Religion organized by the American Association for the Advancement of Science at the Field Museum the year before.

== Philosophy ==
Thomas Berry introduced Swimme to the work of Pierre Teilhard de Chardin. Swimme is deeply influenced by Teilhard's ideas. Swimme described his discovery of Teilhard in his foreword to Sarah Appleton Weber's translation of Teilhard's The Human Phenomenon: He adopted Teilhard's thinking that everything in existence has a physical as well as a spiritual dimension. He believes the universe is a deep transfiguration process. Love, truth, compassion and zest—all of these qualities regarded as divine become embodied in the universe. In this way, the universe is imagined as evolving with a telos of beauty.

Suzanne Taylor, founder of Mighty Companions, said Swimme is a charismatic person who seeks to place scientific technology in its context of the infancy of the Earth community as it struggles for reconnection to its sacred source. She believes that human beings are the current culmination of the still-evolving universe. Swimme tells the story of the evolution of the universe and attempts to pull people into a universe of meaning, where there is not only connectivity, but directionality as well.

In Canticle to the Cosmos, Swimme says: "If you look at the disasters happening on our planet, it's because the cosmos is not understood as sacred ... a way out of our difficulty is a journey into the universe as sacred." Harvard astrophysicist Eric Chaisson wrote that

Swimme, a mathematician by training, seeks a larger, warmer, more noble science story, stating that, not merely a collection of facts, science should be a student's guide to a grand world-view, including, if possible, meaning, purpose and value; he sees the cosmological perspective as one to which all modern scientists can objectively subscribe, yet the meaning and purpose of it being a subjective outgrowth of an individual's reflection upon that cosmology ...

In a 2007 interview with Robert Wright, Swimme said

... if you take Buddhism and Christianity and so forth there's a kind of battle — a subtle sort of struggle taking place because they're not standing in a common ground but ... take the Earth or ecology then suddenly they can begin to explore what they have to offer. So I do think absolutely that ... there will be a flourishing of religions, not a withering away. And they will flourish to the degree that they will move into the context of planet and universe.

Pacific Sun newspaper reported that Swimme was at the forefront of a new movement that integrates science and spirituality. Swimme believes there is a new story, the epic of evolution, a cosmological narrative that begins with the Big Bang, which started the whole process, and proceeds to the evolution of the universe and life on Earth. This manner of study, which engages heart and mind together, seems to teeter on the brink of religion. He believes that science, holistically, can have a great impact on people. Big History science is filled with little mysterious coincidences, upon which our entire existence rests. Swimme notes that this inspires awe and humility, and that this cosmology puts people in their proper place. He thinks that the popular view is that the Earth is like a gravel pit or a hardware store, that the Earth is just stuff to be used. He believes that consumerism has become the dominant world faith, exploiting the riches of the Earth. His fundamental aim is to present a new cosmology—one grounded in a contemporary understanding of the universe but nourished by ancient spiritual convictions that help give it meaning.

In an interview in 2001, Swimme gave a basic summary of "the whole story in one line": "This is the greatest discovery of the scientific enterprise: You take hydrogen gas, and you leave it alone, and it turns into rosebushes, giraffes, and humans." Writing for the BBC in 2009, Mark Vernon said that "Swimme believes that 'the universe is attempting to be felt', which makes him a pantheist", and noted that Swimme's work "is avidly read by individuals in New Age and ecological circles".

== Major publications ==
- Manifesto for a Global Civilization (with Matthew Fox), Bear & Company, 1982, ISBN 0-939680-05-X
- The Universe is a Green Dragon: A Cosmic Creation Story, Bear & Company, 1984, ISBN 0-939680-14-9
- The Universe Story: From the Primordial Flaring Forth to the Ecozoic Era: A Celebration of the Unfolding of the Cosmos, Harper San Francisco, 1992 (1994, ISBN 0-06-250835-0)—a culmination of a 10-year collaboration with cultural historian Thomas Berry
- The Hidden Heart of the Cosmos, Orbis, 1996 (revised 2019, ISBN 978-1626983434)
- A Walk Through Time: From Stardust to Us—The Evolution of Life on Earth (with Sidney Liebes and Elisabet Sahtouris), John Wiley & Sons, 1998, ISBN 0-471-31700-4
- "Cosmological Education for Future Generations", Chapter 5 in The Thirteenth Labor: Improving Science Education, edited by Eric Chaisson and Tae-Chang Kim, CRC Press, 1999, ISBN 9057005387, doi:10.1201/9781003078357-5
- Journey of the Universe (with Mary Evelyn Tucker), Yale University Press, 2011, ISBN 978-0-300-17190-7
- Cosmogenesis: An Unveiling of the Expanding Universe, Counterpoint, 2022, ISBN 978-1-640-09398-0
- The Story of the Noosphere (with Monica Deraspe-Bolles), Orbis Books, 2024

Swimme's media work includes the video series, Canticle to the Cosmos, The Hidden Heart of the Cosmos and The Powers of the Universe.

Swimme introduced Barbara Hand Clow in her books, Heart of the Christos: Starseeding from the Pleiades, Bear & Company, 1989, ISBN 0-939680-59-9, and The Pleiadian Agenda: A New Cosmology for the Age of Light, Bear & Company, 1995, ISBN 1-879181-30-4.

== See also ==
- Creation–evolution controversy
- Mary Evelyn Tucker § Journey of the Universe
- Timeline of cosmology
