= Thomas Berry =

American Catholic priest and scholar (1914–2009)

The Rev. Dr. Thomas Berry CP
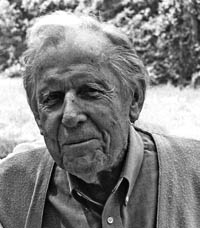
- Born: November 9, 1914; Greensboro, North Carolina, U.S.
- Died: June 1, 2009 (aged 94); Greensboro, North Carolina, U.S.
- Occupations: Cultural historian; historian of world religions; "geologian"
- Organization: Passionists

Thomas Berry, CP (November 9, 1914 – June 1, 2009) was an American Catholic priest, cultural historian, and scholar of the world's religions, especially Asian traditions. Later, as he studied Earth history and evolution, he called himself a "geologian". He rejected the labels "theologian" and "ecotheologian" as too narrow and not descriptive of his religions arguments.

He was drawn early on to respond to the growing ecological and climate crisis and proposed the need for a "New Story" of evolution in 1978. In this essay, he suggested that a deep understanding of the unfolding and evolution of the universe is necessary as a guide for human inspiration, individually and as a species.

Berry believed that humanity, after generations spent in despoiling the planet, is poised to embrace a new role as a vital part of a larger, interdependent Earth community, consisting of a "communion of subjects not a collection of objects". He felt that we were at a critical turning point, moving out of the Cenozoic era and entering into a new evolutionary phase, which would either be an Ecozoic Era, characterized by mutually-enhancing human-Earth relations, or a Techozoic Era, where we dominate and exploit the planet via our technological mastery.

Berry said the transformation of humanity's priorities will not come easily. It requires what he called "the great work"—the title of one of his books—in four institutional realms: the political and legal order; the economic and industrial world; education; and religion.

== Biography ==
Born to William and Bess Berry in Greensboro, North Carolina, in 1914, Berry was the third of 13 children. His father founded Berico Fuels in 1924. At age 11 he had an epiphany in a meadow, which became a primary reference point for the rest of his life. He later elaborated this experience into a set of "Twelve Principles for Understanding the Universe", which became the basis for his contributions to Earth Jurisprudence. These principles are based on this perspective:

The universe, the solar system, and planet Earth in themselves and in their evolutionary emergence constitute for the human community the primary revelation of that ultimate mystery whence all things emerge into being.

Berry entered a monastery of the Passionist order in 1933, where he adopted the name "Thomas", after Thomas Aquinas. He was ordained a priest in 1942. He began studying cultural history, especially the world's religions.

He received his doctorate in history from The Catholic University of America, with a thesis on Giambattista Vico's philosophy of history. He then studied Chinese language and Chinese culture in China (for a year) and in the US, and learned Sanskrit for the study of Hinduism. He published a book on Buddhism (1966) and one on the Religions of India (1971). He taught Asian religions at universities in New Jersey and New York (1956–1965). He then became the founder and director of the graduate program in the history of religions at Fordham University (1966–1979). There he directed over twenty doctoral dissertations. During this period he also founded and directed the Riverdale Center of Religious Research in Riverdale, New York (1970–1995).

In addition to Asian religions, he studied and taught classes on Native American cultures and shamanism. He assisted in an educational program for the T'boli tribal peoples of South Cotabato, on the island of Mindanao in the Philippines.

From his academic beginnings as a historian of world cultures and religions, Berry developed into a historian of the Earth and its evolutionary processes. He was influenced by the work of the Jesuit scientist Pierre Teilhard de Chardin, and he served as president of the American Teilhard Association (1975–1987). Berry took Teilhard's major ideas on evolution and expanded them into an epic story to which we belong. To that end, with the cosmologist Brian Swimme he wrote The Universe Story (1992). The multimedia project Journey of the Universe (2011) was also inspired by this perspective. This is a film (dedicated to Berry), a book, a series of conversations on DVDs and podcasts, and online courses from Yale/Coursera.

Berry's work inspired his younger brother Jim to establish the Center for Reflection on the Second Law, which held annual conferences near Chapel Hill, North Carolina, from 1984 until Jim's passing in 1997, and which featured Thomas as a frequent speaker.

In 1995, Berry returned to Greensboro, North Carolina. While nominally retired, he continued to write, lecture, and receive friends at his home. In a tribute to Berry, Mary Evelyn Tucker said that his books—The Dream of the Earth (1988 reprinted, 2006), The Universe Story (with Brian Swimme, 1992), and The Great Work: Our Way into the Future (1999)—are "major contributions to discussions on the environment". A collection of his essays, Evening Thoughts: Reflecting on Earth as Sacred Community (2006), was jointly published by Sierra Club Books and the University of California Press. He completed two final books of essays in 2009, The Sacred Universe and The Christian Future and the Fate of Earth.

Berry also contributed two introductory essays ("Economics: Its Effects on the Life Systems of the World" and "The Earth: A New Context for Religious Unity") to the volume Thomas Berry and the New Cosmology, in which Brian Swimme, Caroline Richards, Gregory Baum and others discuss the implications of Berry's thought for a range of disciplines and paradigms. Berry's "Twelve Principles for Understanding the Universe and the Role of the Human in the Universe Process" offer a postscript to this 1987 work.

He died in 2009 at the age of 94.

== Legacy ==
A lengthy obituary in National Catholic Reporter assessed that Thomas Berry "was among the first to say the earth crisis is fundamentally a spiritual crisis" and that "many created their own earth ministries, inspired by the work and life of Fr. Thomas Berry."

Berry was one of several people featured in the 2007 documentary What a Way to Go: Life at the End of Empire.

His work is disseminated and discussed by the Thomas Berry Foundation, the American Teilhard Association, the Yale Forum on Religion and Ecology, and the Journey of the Universe project. In 2014, the Yale Forum on Religion and Ecology hosted a conference at Yale University titled "Living Cosmology: Christian Responses to Journey of the Universe" to honor Berry's 100th birthday. An online course "The Worldview of Thomas Berry: The Flourishing of the Earth Community" is available through Yale/Coursera and is hosted by Mary Evelyn Tucker and John Grim of Yale University. In 2018, The Leadership for the Ecozoic (L4E) project was initiated with the first cohort of fellows based at the University of Vermont and McGill University. In 2019, Thomas Berry: A Biography was published by Columbia University Press, written by Tucker, Grim, and Andrew Angyal. That same year, the "Thomas Berry and 'The Great Work'" Conference was held at Georgetown University.

== Major publications ==
- Berry, Thomas. Thomas Berry: Selected Writings on the Earth Community. Selected with an Introduction by Mary Evelyn Tucker and John Grim. Modern Spiritual Masters Series. Maryknoll, NY: Orbis Books, 2014.
- Berry, Thomas. The Christian Future and the Fate of Earth. Edited by Mary Evelyn Tucker and John Grim. Maryknoll, NY: Orbis Books, 2009.
- Berry, Thomas. The Sacred Universe: Earth, Spirituality, and Religion in the Twenty-First Century. Edited by Mary Evelyn Tucker. New York: Columbia University Press, 2009.
- Berry, Thomas. Evening Thoughts: Reflecting on Earth as Sacred Community. Edited by Mary Evelyn Tucker. Berkeley: Counterpoint Press, 2015 (orig. San Francisco: Sierra Club Books & University of California Press, 2006).
- Berry, Thomas. The Great Work: Our Way Into the Future. New York: Harmony/Bell Tower, 1999.
- Berry, Thomas with Brian Swimme. The Universe Story: From the Primordial Flaring Forth to the Ecozoic Era – A Celebration of the Unfolding of the Cosmos. San Francisco: Harper San Francisco, 1992.
- Berry, Thomas. The Dream of the Earth. Berkeley: Counterpoint Press, 2015 (orig. San Francisco: Sierra Club Books, 1988).

== Papers ==
Berry's papers are archived at the Environmental Science and Public Policy Archives in the Harvard Library.

== Honorary degrees ==
- 2008 Honorary Doctorate of Humane Letters, Elon University, Elon, North Carolina, March 15, 2008
- 2003 Honorary Doctorate of Theology, Catholic Theological Union, Chicago, Illinois
- 1998 Honorary Doctorate of Humane Letters, The College of Mt. St. Vincent, Riverdale, New York. October 19, 1998
- 1997 Honorary Doctorate of Humane Letters, St. Mary's University, Halifax, Nova Scotia, Canada
- 1997 Honorary Doctorate of Humane Letters, Loyola Marymount University, Los Angeles, California
- 1994 Honorary Doctorate of Humane Letters, St. Thomas University of Miami, Florida
- 1994 Honorary Doctorate of Humane Letters, Loyola University of New Orleans, Louisiana
- 1993 Honorary Doctorate of Humane Letters, California Institute of Integral Studies, San Francisco, California

== Other honors and awards ==
- 2007 Earth is Community conference held in London, UK to honor Thomas Berry, organized by the Gaia Foundation and Greenspirit, September 15, 2007
- 2005 Thomas Berry Student-Writing Award established by the Environmental Leadership Center, Warren Wilson College, Asheville, North Carolina, to foster dialogue and quality writing on environmental themes
- 2003 Frederick II Peace Prize, Pax Romana Earth Charter Project, Castel del Monte, Adria, Italy, March 15, 2003
- 2002 The Cosmological Imagination conference held in Berkeley, California, to honor Thomas Berry organized by the Philosophy, Cosmology and Consciousness Department of the California Institute of Integral Studies, November 2 to 4, 2002
- 2002 Juliet Hollister Award, The Temple of Understanding, University Club, New York City, April 16, 2002
- 2001 Francis of Assisi Award for contribution to Earth Day Forum on Nature and Culture, presented to Thomas Berry by DePaul University's Institute for Nature and Culture, Chicago, Illinois
- 2000 Thomas Berry Professorship proposed for the Loyola Institute for Ministry of Loyola University, New Orleans
- 2000 Named to the Council of Honored Elders of the group Earth Elders, Santa Rosa, CA
- 1999 The Thomas Berry Hall at the Whidbey Institute of Chinook on Whidbey Island north of Seattle, dedication July 23, 1999
- 1999 The Thomas Berry Lecture established by the Fine Arts Department of the University of British Columbia, 1999, endowed by Fine-Arts Professor Emeritus Herb Gilbert, choosing the title Ecozoic Art Prize based on the term originating with Thomas Berry
- 1999 David C. Korten's book The Post-Corporate World: Life After Capitalism is dedicated to Thomas Berry
- 1999 Inclusion in World Authors 1990–1995 of H.W. Wilson Co.
- 1998 First Annual Jerry Mische Global Service Award of Global Education Associates, on their 25th Anniversary Celebration, April 30, 1998
- 1998 The Thomas Berry Foundation established in Washington, DC
- 1998 First Annual Thomas Berry Environmental Award and Lectureship sponsored by the Center for Reflection on the Second Law (CRSL) and the Humane Society of the United States, presented by Dr Mary Evelyn Tucker
- 1997 The New York Open Center Award: "A Visionary Voice in the Merging of Ecology and Spirituality", October 30, 1997
- 1997 College of Mount St. Vincent on-the-Hudson first annual Thomas Berry Environmental Award made to Robert F. Kennedy Jr. for Achievement in Restoring Ecological Health to the Hudson Valley Region of New York State
- 1996 Inclusion in the New Catholic Encyclopedia XIX (Supplement 1989–1996)
- 1995 The Lannan Foundation Literary Award for Non-Fiction for The Dream of the Earth, $50,000 prize
- 1995 Made an honorary charter member of The Club of Budapest, June 1995
- 1995 First Green Dove Award of Common Boundary, November 10, 1995
- 1993 The Catholic University of America Alumni Award for Achievement in Research and Scholarship, October 23, 1993
- 1993 The Bishop Carroll T. Dozier Medal for Peace and Justice, The Christian Brothers University of Memphis, Tennessee
- 1992 Named Honorary Canon of the Episcopal Cathedral of St. John the Divine, New York
- 1992 The James Herriott Award, The Humane Society of the United States
- 1992 The Prescott College Environmental Award, Prescott, Arizona
- 1992 Scholar-in-Residence for the Humane Society of the United States on a continuing appointment
- 1989 The United States Catholic Mission Association Annual Award

== See also ==
- Alfred North Whitehead
- The Great Story
