= Rights of nature law =

Rights of nature law is the codification and other implementations of the legal and jurisprudential theory of the rights of nature. This legal school of thought describes inherent rights as associated with ecosystems and species, similar to the concept of fundamental human rights.

The early 2000s saw a significant expansion of rights of nature law, in the form of constitutional provisions, treaty agreements, national and subnational statutes, local laws, and court decisions. As of 2022, nature's rights laws exist at the local to national levels in 39 countries, including in Canada, at least seven Tribal Nations in the U.S. and Canada, and over 60 cities and counties throughout the United States. The total number of initiatives was 409 as of June 2021 and 495 as of May 2024. The EcoJurisprudence Monitor lists over 540 as of early 2025.

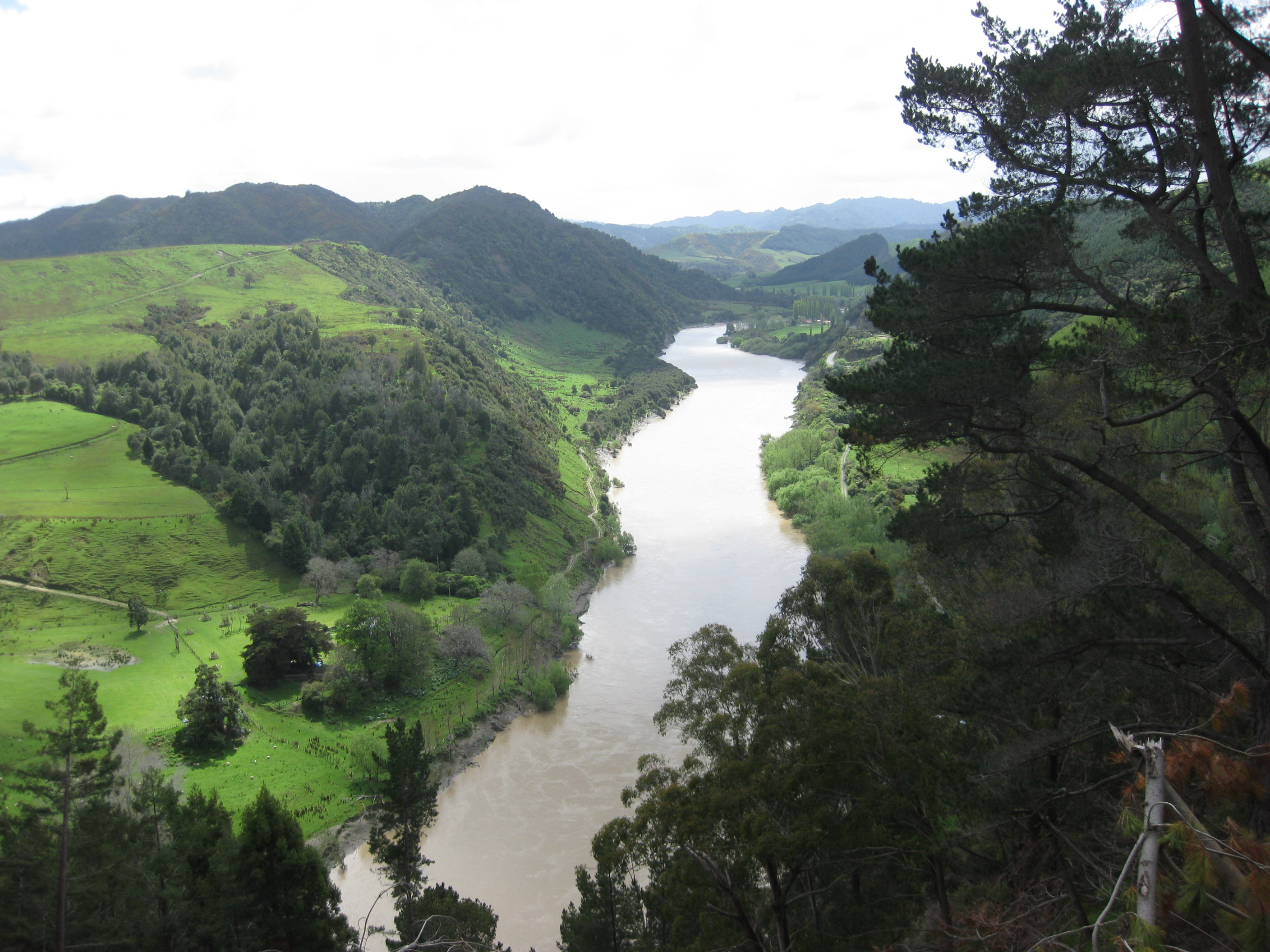
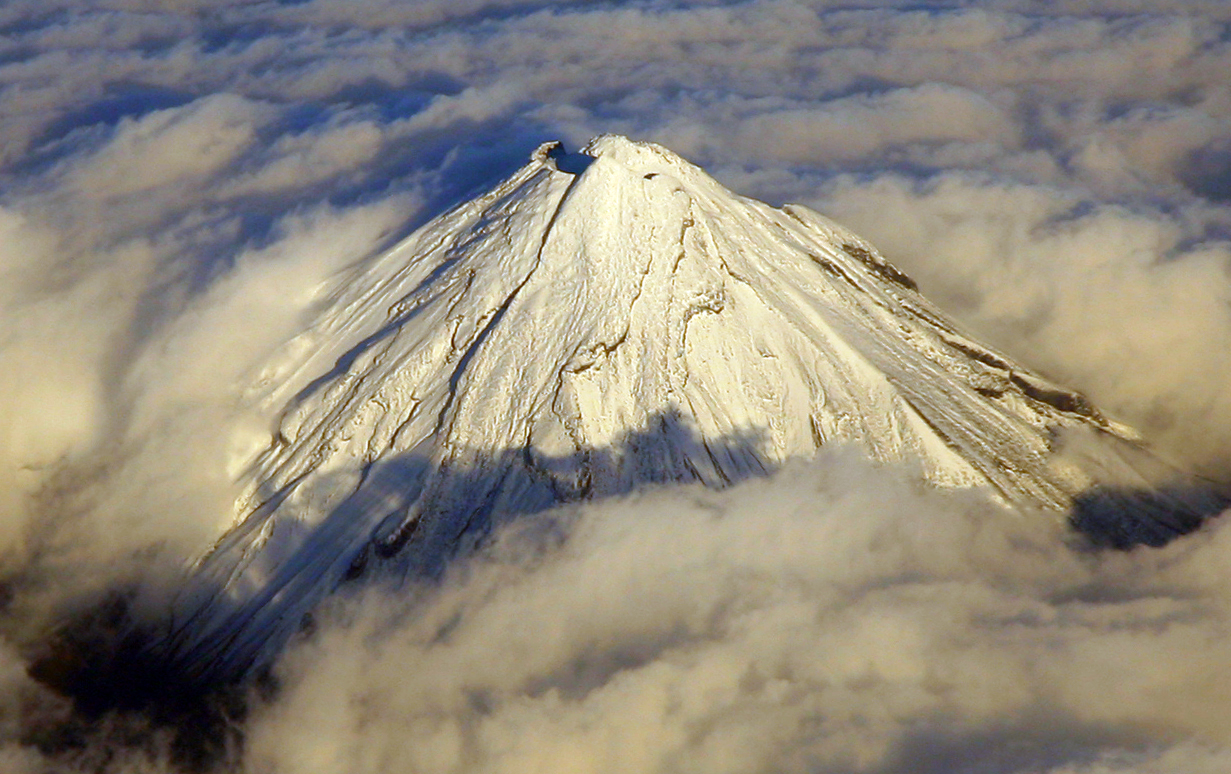
New Zealand - in 2012 a treaty agreement between the government and the indigenous group Maori iwi established the Whanganui River (top image), and its tributaries as a legal entity with its own standing. Similarly, Mount Taranaki (bottom image) was recognized in 2014 as "a legal personality, in its own right".

== Treaties ==
=== New Zealand ===
Legal standing for natural systems in New Zealand arose alongside new attention paid to long-ignored treaty agreements with the Indigenous Maori. In August 2012, a treaty agreement signed with the Maori iwi recognized the Whanganui River and tributaries as a legal entity, an "indivisible and living whole" with its own standing. The national Te Awa Tupua Act was enacted in March 2017 to further formalize this status.

In 2013, the Te Urewera Forest treaty agreement similarly recognized the legal personhood of the Forest, with the Te Urewera Act signed into law in 2014 to formalize this status. In 2017 a treaty settlement with the Maori was signed that recognized Mount Taranaki as "a legal personality, in its own right".

Each of these developments advanced the indigenous principle that the ecosystems are living, spiritual beings with intrinsic value, incapable of being owned in an absolute sense.

== Constitutional law ==
=== Ecuador ===
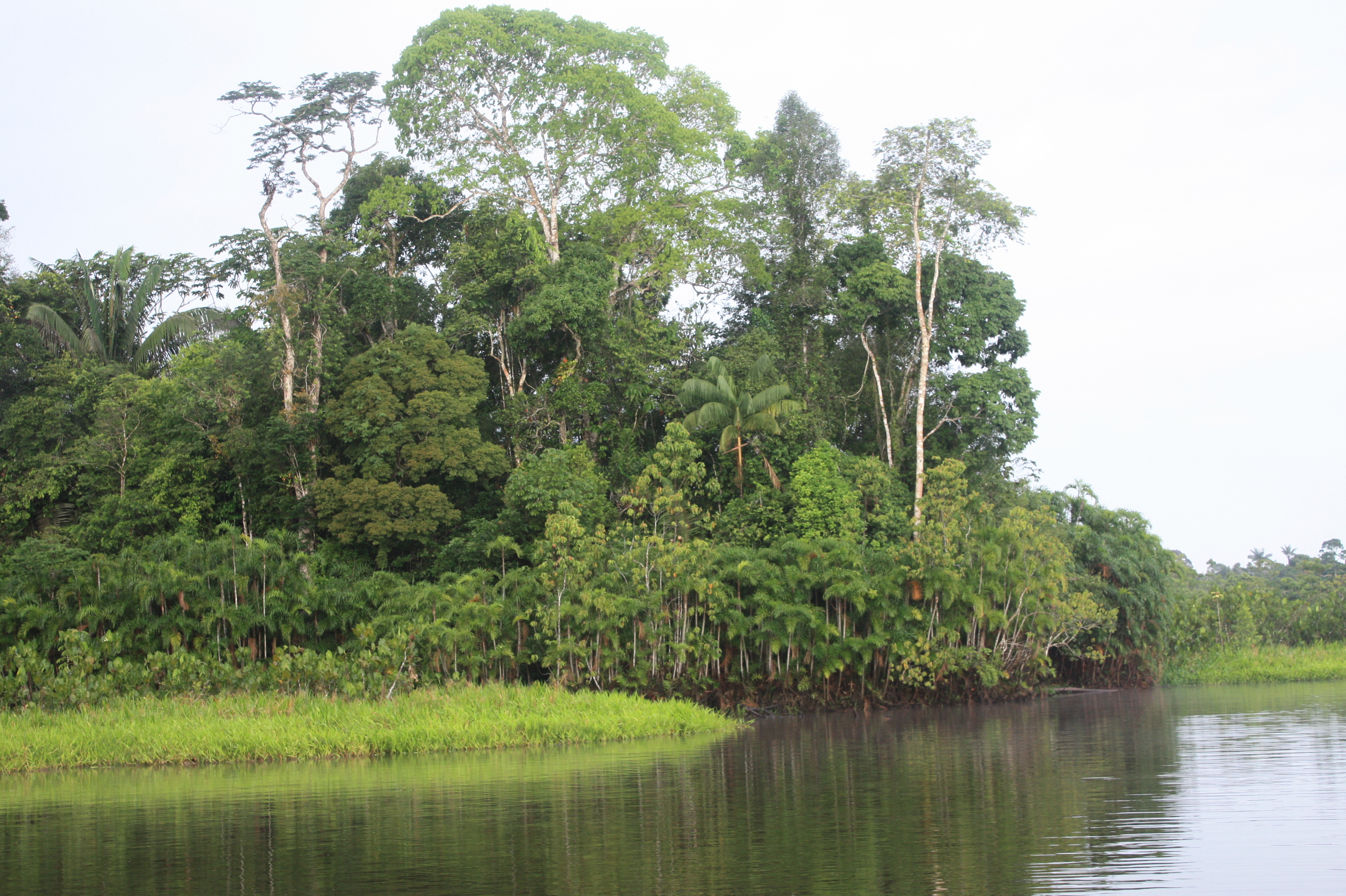
Yasuní National Park, Ecuador

In 2008, the people of Ecuador amended their Constitution to recognize the inherent rights of nature, or Pachamama. The new text arose in large part as a result of cosmologies of the indigenous rights movement and actions to protect the Amazon, consistent with the concept of sumak kawsay ("buen vivir" in Spanish, "good living" in English), or encapsulating a life in harmony with nature with humans as part of the ecosystem. Among other provisions, Article 71 states that "Nature or Pachamama, where life is reproduced and exists, has the right to exist, persist, maintain itself and regenerate its own vital cycles, structure, functions and its evolutionary processes." The Article adds enforcement language as well, stating that "Any person... may demand the observance of the rights of the natural environment before public bodies", and echoing Christopher Stone, Article 72 adds that “Nature has the right to be completely restored... independent of the obligation... to compensate people”.

== Judicial decisions ==
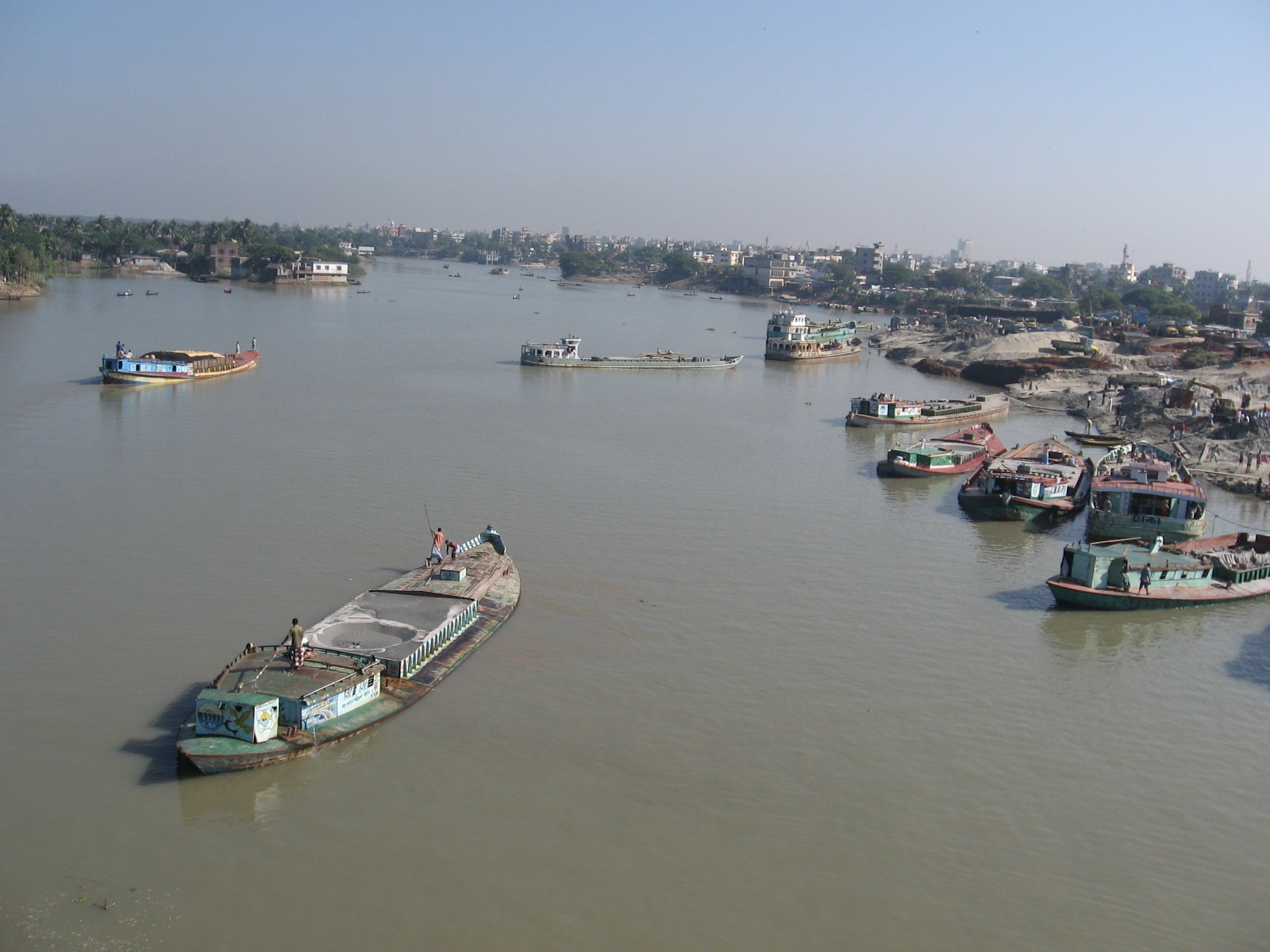
Turag River, near Dhaka, Bangladesh

=== Bangladesh ===
In 2019, the High Court of Bangladesh ruled on a case addressing pollution of and illegal development along the Turag River, an upper tributary of the Buriganga.

Among its findings, the high court recognized the river as a living entity with legal rights, and it further held that the same would apply to all rivers in Bangladesh. The court ordered the National River Protection Commission to serve as the guardian for the Turag and other rivers.

=== Colombia ===
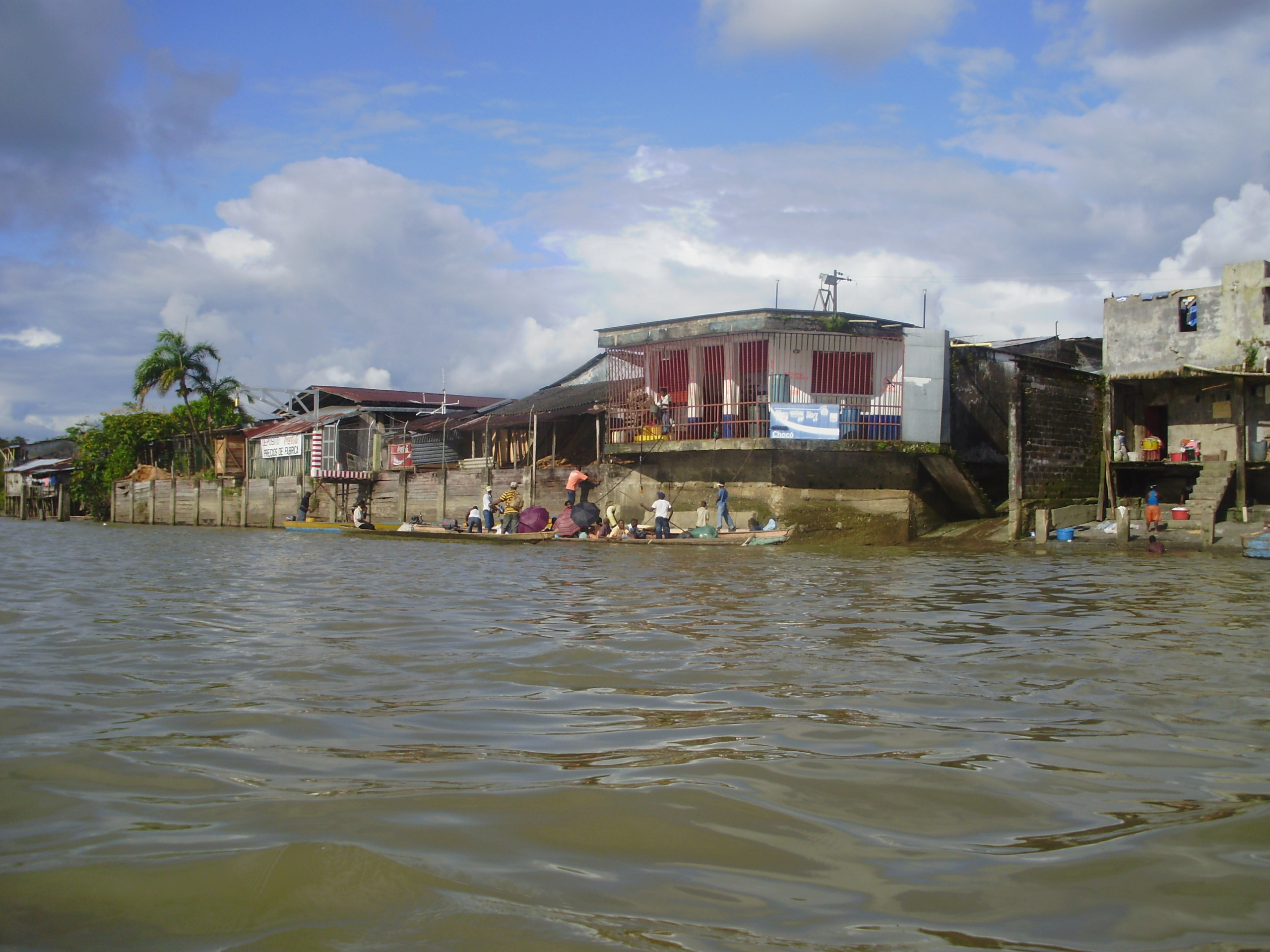
Atrato River in Colombia - in a 2016 ruling by the Constitutional Court involving the river's pollution, the court stated that the river is a subject of rights, and that humans are "only one more event within a long evolutionary chain [and] in no way... owner of other species, biodiversity or natural resources, or the fate of the planet".

Colombia has not adopted statutes or constitutional provisions addressing nature's rights (as of 2019). However, this has not prevented Colombian courts from finding nature's rights as inherent. In a 2016 case, the Colombia Constitutional Court ordered cleanup of the polluted Atrato River, stating that nature is a "true subject of rights that must be recognized by states and exercised... for example, by the communities that inhabit it or have a special relationship with it”. The court added that humans are “only one more event within a long evolutionary chain [and] in no way... owner of other species, biodiversity or natural resources, or the fate of the planet".

In 2018, the Colombia Supreme Court took up a climate change case by a group of children and young adults that also raised fundamental rights issues. In addition to making legal findings related to human rights, the court found that the Colombian Amazon is a "'subject of rights', entitled to protection, conservation, maintenance and restoration". It recognized the special role of Amazon deforestation in creating greenhouse gas emissions in Colombia, and as a remedy ordered the nation and its administrative agencies to ensure a halt to all deforestation by 2020. The court further allocated enforcement power to the plaintiffs and affected communities, requiring the agencies to report to the communities and empowering them to inform the court if the agencies were not meeting their deforestation targets.

=== Ecuador ===
A significant body of case law has been expanding in Ecuador to implement the nation's constitutional provisions regarding the rights of nature. Examples include lawsuits in the areas of biodigestor pollution, impaired flow in the Vilcabamba River, and hydropower.

=== Germany ===
In August 2024, the Regional Court (Landgericht) of Erfurt became the first German court to recognize rights of Nature under the EU Charter of Fundamental Rights in an important decision.

=== India ===
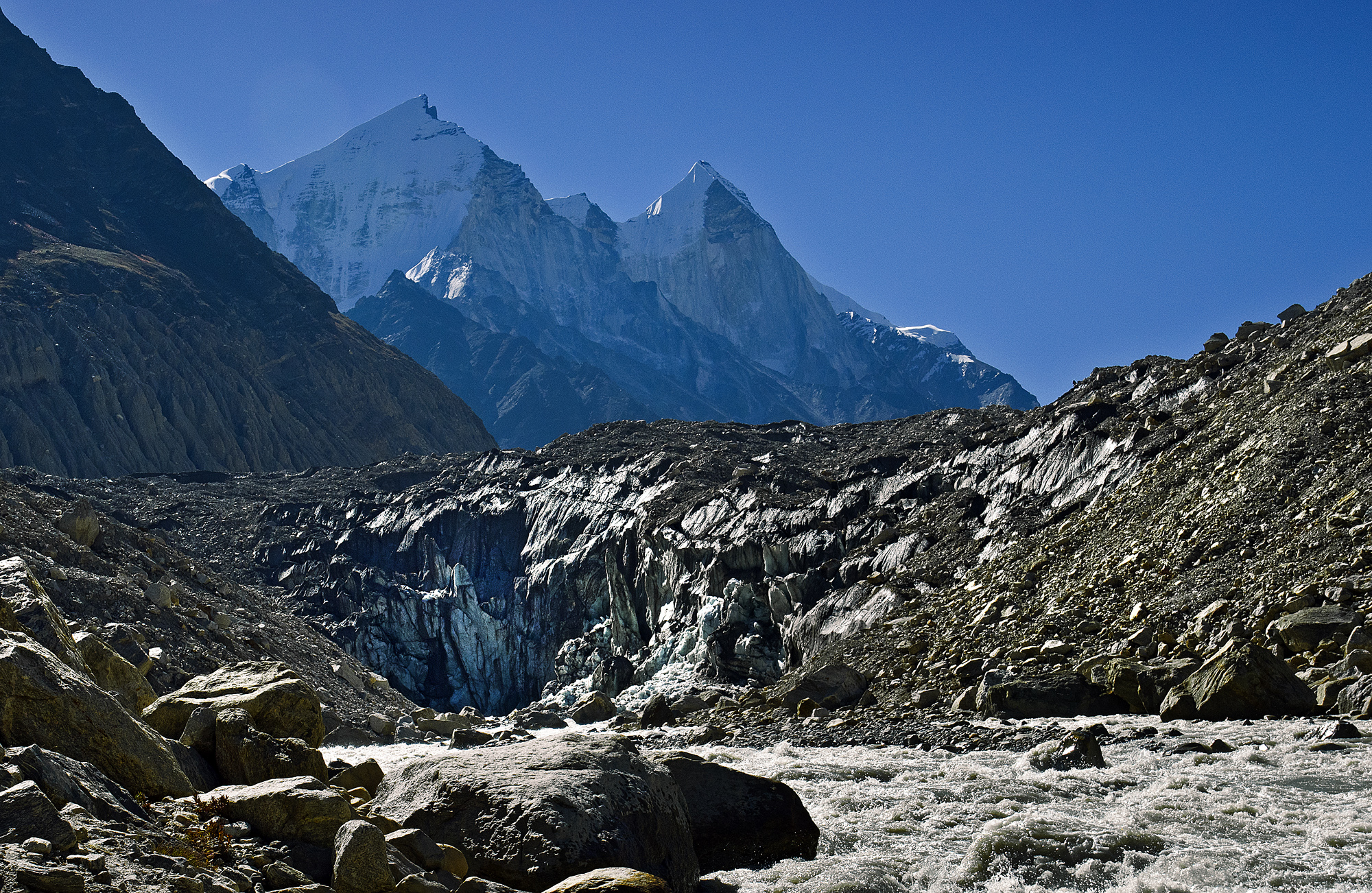
Gangotri Glacier, a source of the Ganga river

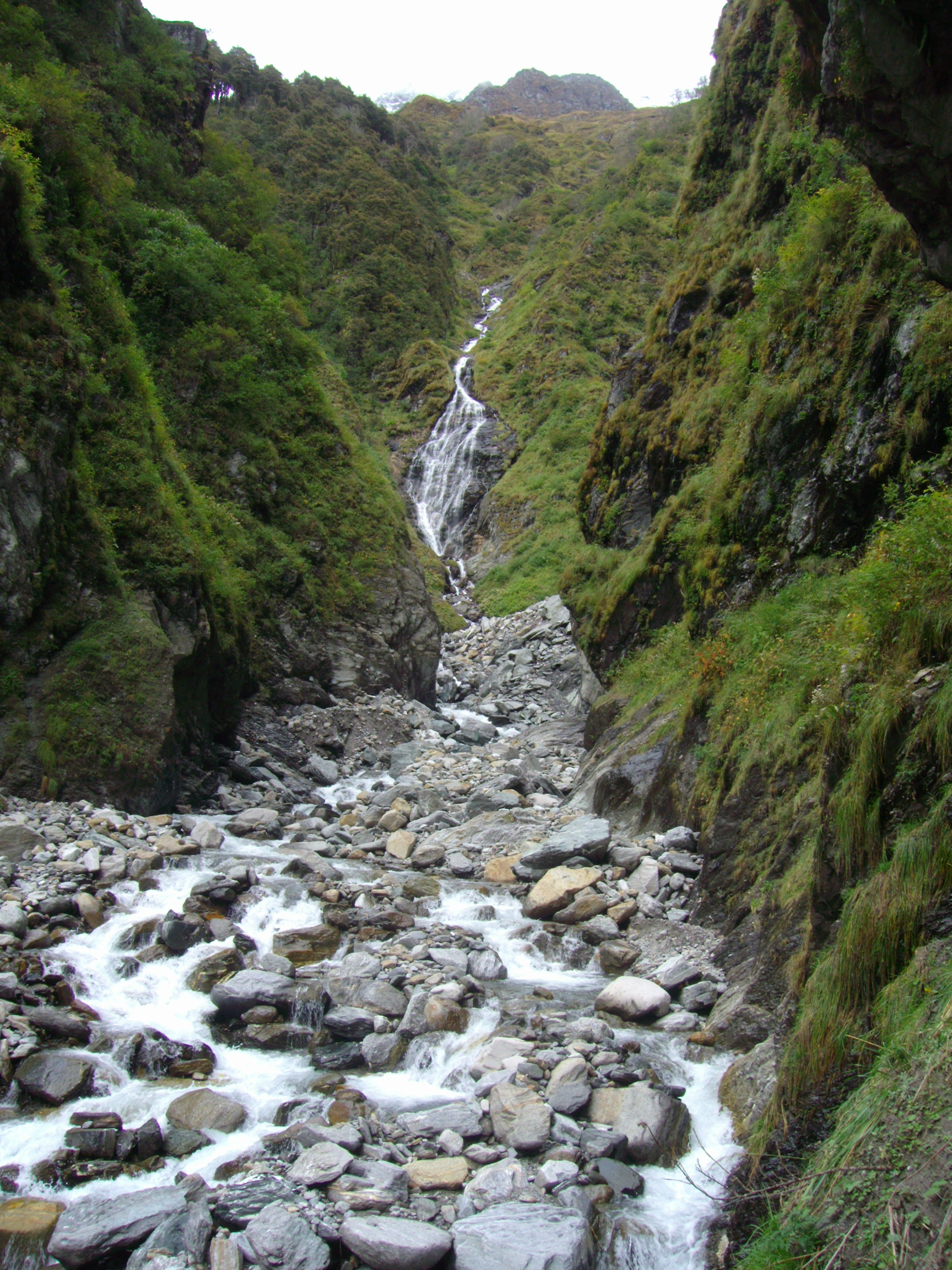
The river Yamuna at Yamunotri Glacier

As in Colombia, as of 2019 no statutes or constitutional provisions in India specifically identified rights of nature. Nevertheless, the India Supreme Court in 2012 set the stage for cases to come before it on rights of nature, finding that "Environmental justice could be achieved only if we drift away from the principle of anthropocentric to ecocentric... humans are part of nature and non-human has intrinsic value."

The Uttarakhand High Court applied the principle of ecocentric law in 2017, recognizing the legal personhood of the Ganga and Yamuna rivers and ecosystems, and calling them "living human entities" and juridical and moral persons. The court quickly followed with similar judgments for the glaciers associated with the rivers, including the Gangotri and Yamunotri, and other natural systems. While the India Supreme Court stayed the Ganga and Yamuna judgment at the request of local authorities, those authorities supported the proposed legal status in concept, but were seeking "implementation guidance".

=== Peru ===
The Marañón River, one of the Amazon's largest tributaries, is now recognized as a legal entity with inherent rights. The Nauta court in Loreto has ruled that what is one of the country's most important rivers and water sources must now be considered a subject with real rights.

This decision was initiated by the Kukama indigenous community of Shapajilla, Loreto, led by women and supported by the Legal Defense Institute.

== National, sub-national, and local law ==
=== Canada ===
==== Quebec ====
On February 23, 2021, the Alliance for the Protection of the Magpie/Muteshekau Shipu River (in Innu), in partnership with the International Observatory on Nature’s Rights, announced the recognition of legal personhood of the Magpie River. The Magpie River is located in Nitassinan (ancestral territory of the Innu people), in eastern Quebec. Its Innu name, Muteshekau Shipu, means “the river where the water passes between square rocky cliffs”.

=== Bolivia ===
Following adoption of nature's rights language in its 2009 Constitution, in 2010 Bolivia's Legislature passed the Law of the Rights of Mother Earth, Act No. 071. Bolivia followed this broad outline of nature's rights with the 2012 Law of Mother Earth and Integral Development for Living Well, Act. No. 300, which provided some implementation details consistent with nature's rights. It states in part that the "violation of the rights of Mother Earth, as part of comprehensive development for Living Well, is a violation of public law and the collective and individual rights". While a step forward, this enforcement piece has not yet risen to the level of a specific enforcement mechanism.

=== Mexico ===
State, regional, and local laws and local constitutional provisions have been arising in Mexico, including adoption in the constitutions of the Mexican states of Colima and Guerrero, and that of Mexico City.

=== Spain ===
On September 30, 2022, Parliament passed Law 19/2022, recognizing the legal personhood of the Mar Menor and its basin, thus becoming the first ecosystem in Europe with its own rights. On March 31, 2023 the regulation concerning the application of the law on the legal personality of the Mar Menor was published for public comment. The Constitutional Court of Spain has since affirmed the confirmity of Law 19/2022 with the consitution and highlighted that “this is the first euro-mediterranean law that falls within the model that attributes legal personality to natural entities [...]."

=== Uganda ===
Part 1, Section 4 of Uganda's 2019 National Environment Act addresses the Rights of Nature, stating in part that "Nature has the right to exist, persist, maintain and regenerate its vital cycles, structure, functions and its processes in evolution." Advocates who had sought inclusion of such language observed that "Ugandans' right to a healthy environment cannot be realised unless the health of Nature herself is protected," and that the language adoption reflected "recent gains for the growing African movement for Earth Jurisprudence".

=== United States ===
At the local level dozens of ordinances with rights of nature provisions have been passed as of 2019 throughout the United States, and in tribal lands located within the U.S. boundaries. Most were passed in reaction to a specific threat to local well-being, such as threats posed by hydrofracking, groundwater extraction, gravel mining, and fossil fuel extraction. For example, Pittsburgh, Pennsylvania passed an anti-fracking law that included the following provision to buttress protections: "Natural communities and ecosystems... possess inalienable and fundamental rights to exist and flourish." The ordinance continues that "Residents... shall possess legal standing to enforce those rights."

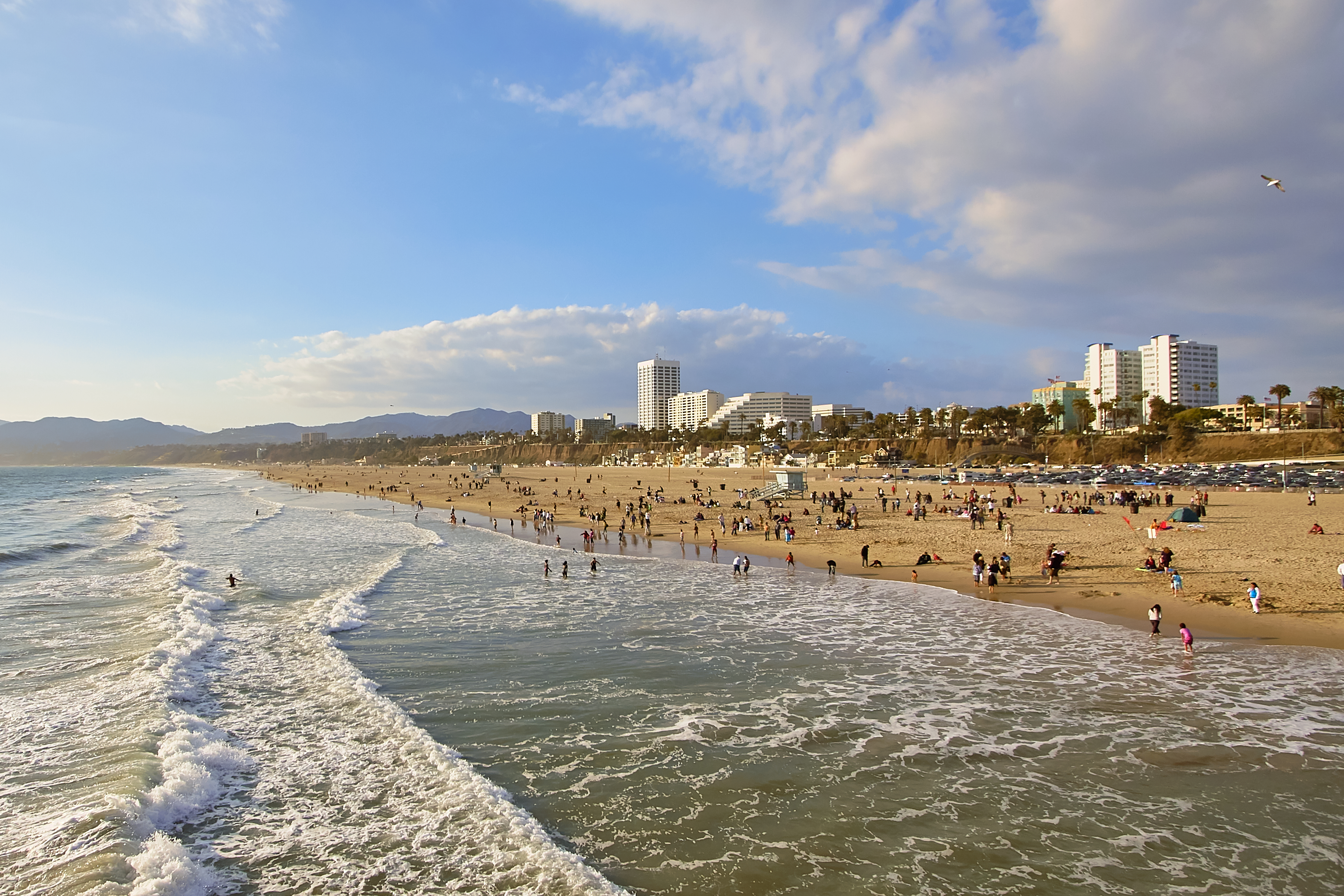
Santa Monica State Beach - in 2013 the city adopted a "Sustainability Rights Ordinance", recognizing the "fundamental and inalienable rights" of "natural communities and ecosystems"

==== California ====
Residents in Santa Monica, California proactively sought to recognize nature's rights in local law after the U.S. Supreme Court's expansion of corporate rights in Citizens United v. FEC. In 2013 the Santa Monica City Council adopted a "Sustainability Rights Ordinance", recognizing the "fundamental and inalienable rights" of "natural communities and ecosystems" in the city to "exist and flourish". The ordinance emphasized that "[c]orporate entities... do not enjoy special privileges or powers under the law that subordinate the community's rights to their private interests". It specifically defined "natural communities and ecosystems" to include "groundwater aquifers, atmospheric systems, marine waters, and native species". Santa Monica updated its Sustainable City Plan in 2014 to reinforce its codified commitment to nature's rights. In 2018, the city council adopted a Sustainable Groundwater Management Ordinance that specifically referenced the inherent rights of the local aquifer to flourish.

==== Florida ====
In November, 2020, voters in Orange County, Florida passed a charter amendment for the "right to clean water" by a margin of 89% that protects waterways in the county from pollution and enables citizens to bring lawsuits to defend against such pollution, becoming the largest community in the country to enact such a rights of nature initiative. It has prompted the Florida Right To Clean Water direct initiative to incorporate the principle into the state constitution, which is gathering petition signatures to have an amendment put onto the 2024 ballot for consideration by all Florida voters. In his January 2022 monthly newsletter, Jim Hightower identified the Florida initiative as, "the epicenter of today’s Rights of Nature political movement".

==== Ohio ====
During a special election in February 2019, voters in Toledo, Ohio passed the "Lake Erie Bill of Rights" (LEBOR). The law was struck down by the Supreme Court of Ohio in 2020. BP North America spent almost $300,000 fighting the bill through a front group.

== Tribal laws ==
=== Ho-Chunk Nation of Wisconsin ===
In 2015 the Ho-Chunk Nation of Wisconsin passed a resolution amending their constitution to include the rights of nature. By 2020 a working group was determining how to integrate the resolution into their constitution, laws, regulations, and processes.

=== Ponca ===
In 2017, the Ponca Nation enacted a rights of nature law which is a resolution that gives the Ponca Tribal Court the power to punish crimes against nature with prison and fines.

== International bodies and soft law ==
=== United Nations ===
Advancements during the early twenty-first century in international "soft law" (quasi-legal instruments generally without legally binding force) have precipitated broader discussions about the potential for integrating nature's rights into legal systems. The United Nations has held nine "Harmony with Nature" General Assembly Dialogues as of 2019 on Earth-centered governance systems and philosophies, including discussions of rights of nature specifically. The companion United Nations Harmony with Nature initiative compiles rights of nature laws globally and offers a U.N. "Knowledge Network" of Earth Jurisprudence practitioners across disciplines. These U.N. Dialogues and the Harmony with Nature initiative may provide a foundation for development of a United Nations-adopted Universal Declaration of the Rights of Nature which, like the U.N.'s Universal Declaration of Human Rights, could form the foundation for rights-based laws worldwide. A model could be the 2010 UDRME, an informal, but widely-supported nature's rights agreement based on the UDHR.

=== International Union for Conservation of Nature ===
In 2012, the International Union for Conservation of Nature (IUCN, the only international observer organization to the U.N. General Assembly with expertise in the environment) adopted a resolution specifically calling for a Universal Declaration of the Rights of Nature. The IUCN reaffirmed its commitment to nature's rights at its next meeting in 2016, where the body voted to build rights of nature implementation into the upcoming, four-year IUCN Workplan. The IUCN's subgroup of legal experts, the World Commission on Environmental Law, later issued an "IUCN World Declaration on the Environmental Rule of Law" recognizing that "Nature has the inherent right to exist, thrive, and evolve".

== Ongoing initiatives ==
=== Canada ===
==== Quebec ====
Since its creation in 2018, the International Observatory on Nature's Rights has been working for the recognition of the legal personality of the St. Lawrence River, one of Quebec's true jewels.

On May 5, 2022, a bill was jointly tabled in the House of Commons and the Quebec National Assembly to recognize the legal personality and rights of the St. Lawrence River, but was never passed.

On April 19, 2023, the Assembly of First Nations Quebec-Labrador recognizes the Legal Personhood of the Saint Lawrence River.

Following recognition of its legal personality by the First Nations, the St. Lawrence River is now waiting to be recognized by the Quebec government.

==== Ontario ====
Although it flows primarily through Quebec, the St. Lawrence River also has a portion in Ontario, where it serves as a natural boundary between that province and New York State in the United States.

Since its launch in November 2023, the Ontario Chapter of the International Observatory for the Rights of Nature has been working for the recognition of the St. Lawrence River in Ontario.

=== France ===
On July 29, 2021, a coalition of peoples including Tavignany Vivu, UMANI and Terre de Liens Corsica-Terra di u Cumunu launched a Declaration of the Rights of the Tavignanu River. This declaration, a first for France, is supported by citizens, local authorities and members of the European Parliament and aims to win support for a local referendum on the status of the Tavignanu River.

Initiated by POLAU in 2019, the Parliament of the Loire approach aims to recognize the rights of the Loire river.

For many years, a number of associations such as Les Gardien.ne.s de la Seine have been campaigning for recognition of the Seine's rights.

=== Switzerland ===
In 2020, the ID-EAU organization launched an initiative to give the Rhône a legal personhood.

=== United Kingdom ===
==== Northern Ireland ====
In response to a series of algal blooms at Lough Neagh caused largely by agricultural pollution, some environmental activists have argued that the lough needs to be brought into community ownership and granted rights of nature.

== Notable documents ==
=== Early legislation, treaties, case law ===
- Germany (2024). Erfurt Regional Court (8th Civil Chamber), judgment of 02.08.2024 - 8 O1373/21
- Quebec (2021). Mirror resolutions of the Ekuanitshit Innu Council and the Minganie Regional County Municipality (MRC).
- Republic of Ecuador (2008). "Constitution, Chapter 7". (First constitutional provisions recognizing nature's rights)
- Plurinational State of Bolivia (2010). "Law of the Rights of Mother Earth, Law No. 071 2010". (Early national law recognizing nature's rights)
- Constitutional Court of the Republic of Colombia (2016). "Judgment in Case T-622 of 2016, Proceeding T-5.016.242" (PDF). (Stating that the contaminated Atrato River is a “true subject of rights”)
- Supreme Court of the Republic of Colombia (2018). "Judgment in Case STC-4360-2018, Filing no. 11001-22-03-000-2018-00319-01". (Recognition of the inherent rights of the Colombian Amazon to a healthy climate)
- Supreme Court of India (2012). "Judgment: T.N. Godavarman Thirumulpad Vs. Union of India & Others". (Constitutional law case calling for a shift from anthropocentric to ecocentric principles of justice)
- High Court of Uttarakhand at Naintal (2017). "Judgment by High Court of Uttarakhand at Naintal regarding Writ Petition (PIL) No. 126 of 2014". (Court decision recognizing the legal personhood of the Ganga and Yamuna rivers in India)
- High Court of Uttarakhand at Naintal (2017). "Judgment by High Court of Uttarakhand at Naintal regarding Writ Petition (PIL) No. 140 of 2015" (PDF). (Court decision recognizing the legal personhood of glaciers and associated natural systems in India)
- New Zealand (2017). Te Awa Tupua (Whanganui River Claims Settlement) Act. (First national law recognizing a river as a legal person)
- New Zealand (2014). Te Urewera Act. (National law recognizing a former national park as a legal person)
- Uganda (2019). "National Environment Act" (PDF). (First national law in Africa recognizing nature's rights)
- "Constitution of Mexico City" (PDF). 2017. (Constitutional provision recognizing “ecosystems and species as a collective entity subject of rights” in one of the world's largest cities)
- "Municipal Code, Title 6, Art 1, Ch. 618, 'Marcellus Shale Natural Gas Drilling Ordinance'". City of Pittsburgh, PA, U.S. 2010. (Largest U.S. city to recognize nature's rights in law, as of 2019)
- "Ordinance of the City Council of the City of Santa Monica Establishing Sustainability Rights, Santa Monica Municipal Code, Art. 4, Ch. 4.75, (April 9, 2013)". City of Santa Monica, CA, U.S. 2013. (First local law on the U.S. West Coast recognizing nature's rights)

=== Other notable documents ===
- "Universal Declaration of the Rights of Mother Earth". World People's Conference on Climate Change and the Rights of Mother Earth. 2010. (First worldwide declaration of nature's rights; modeled on Universal Declaration of Human Rights)
- International Union for Conservation of Nature (2012). "Resolution 100, 'Incorporation of the Rights of Nature as the organizational focal point in IUCN's decision making'". (Call for a Universal Declaration of the Rights of Nature by international experts organization that holds both observer and consultative status at the United Nations)
- International Union for Conservation of Nature, World Commission on Environmental Law (2017). "IUCN World Declaration on the Environmental Rule of Law" (PDF). Archived from the original (PDF) on 2022-01-26. (Statement by IUCN legal experts recognizing that “Nature has the inherent right to exist, thrive, and evolve”)
- Declaration of the Rights of the Moon (2021)

== See also ==
- Animal rights
- Common heritage of humanity
- Deep ecology (an environmental philosophy promoting the inherent worth of living beings regardless of their instrumental utility to human needs)
- Earth jurisprudence
- Ecocide (attempts to criminalize human activities that cause extensive damage to ecosystems)
- Environmental personhood
- Sumak kawsay (Buen Vivir, or "good living", rooted in the worldview of the Quechua peoples of the Andes)
- Wild law (human laws that are consistent with Earth jurisprudence)
