= Earth law =

Legal Framework for Ecocentric Environmental Law

Earth law is an emerging legal framework that seeks to advance the legal rights of the Earth in international law. Earth lawyers consider earth law to be a different form of legal practice from environmental law on the basis of ecocentrism, rather than anthropocentrism. Earth law seeks to codify protections for the environment not just for human health or desires but for the earth itself. It includes all types of lawyering which establish rights or protections for the interest of nature, rather than the interest of humans.

Earth law is guided by advocate Thomas Berry's philosophy of earth jurisprudence, which, according to the United Nations posits that "humans are only one part of a wider community of beings and that the welfare of each member of that community is dependent on the welfare of the Earth as a whole."

Berry was inspired by Christopher Stone, a law professor at the University of Southern California, who was one of the first to call for judicial reform on nature, with his 1974 book, Should Trees Have Standing? Towards Legal Rights for Natural Objects. The legal and jurisprudential theory of the rights of nature, similar to the concept of fundamental human rights presented in the book became a cornerstone of the earth law framework.

In practice, one way practitioners attempt to work earth law into existing anthropocentric law is by establishing environmental personhood, in which a legal argument seeks to establish the Earth, or aspects of the Earth such as rivers, watersheds, mountains etc. as deserving of their own rights and therefore having the status of a legal person.

Other law movements included in Earth law include nonhuman animal rights, defining ecocide as a crime outside of the context of war, rights of future generations, legal guardianship for nature, and Indigenous peoples legalities.

== See also ==
- Rights of nature law
- Animal law
- International law on Ecocide
- Legal rights of future generations
- Legal guardianship of nature
- Indigenous environmental rights
