= Law of Bolivia =

The law of Bolivia includes a constitution and several codes.

== Constitution ==
Bolivia has had seventeen constitutions.

== Sources ==
By 1840, sources of the law of Bolivia included: (1) Acts of the Peru-Bolivian Confederation, before the revolution of Bolivia. (2) Acts of the legislature of the Republic. Among these Acts, there was a general code of laws, entitled Codigo Santa Cruz. This title is evidently in imitation of the title of Code Napoleon; for Santa Cruz is the name of the general who was elected president of the Republic in 1828; and under his presidency, the Codigo was published. (3) Decisions of the Bolivian courts. (4) Spanish law. (5) Roman civil law. (6) The ancient Peruvian law, or the customs and usages of the country.

== Legislation ==
The legislature has been called the Congreso Nacional. The gazette is called Gaceta Oficial de Bolivia.

=== List of legislation ===
- Spanish Criminal Code of 1822
- Penal Code of 1834
- Mining Law of 13 October 1880
- Rules for the application of the Mining Law of 28 October 1882
- Law of 3 September 1883
- Code of Criminal Procedure of 6 August 1898
- Penal Code of 23 August 1972 (Decree Law No 10426)
- Code of Criminal Procedure of 1972
- Commercial Code of 25 February 1977 (Decree Law No 14379)
- Supreme Decree 21060 of 29 August 1985
- Law of 13 April 1992 on copyright
- Law No 1768 of 10 March 1997
- Law No 2494 of 4 August 2003
- Law Against Racism 2010
- Law of the Rights of Mother Earth (No 71 of 2010)
- Framework Law of Mother Earth and Integral Development for Living Well (No 300 of 2012)

== Courts and judiciary ==
Courts have included the Plurinational Constitutional Court, the Supreme Court of Justice, and the Tribunal Supremo Electoral

== Criminal law ==
The Spanish Criminal Code of 1822 came into force in Bolivia on 2 April 1831. It was replaced by the Penal Code of 1834. A Law of 3 September 1883 made provision in relation to perjury. Bolivia now has a new Penal Code of 23 August 1972.

There was a Code of Criminal Procedure of 6 August 1898. This was replaced by the Code of Criminal Procedure of 1972.

== Copyright ==
As to copyright, see the law of 13 April 1992.

== Mining ==
In 1892, the mining laws of Bolivia consisted of the Ley de Minería (Mining Law), promulgated on 13 October 1880, and the Reglamento de la Ley de Minería (Rules for the application of the Mining Law), promulgated on 28 October 1882. The International Bureau of the American Republics said that the "provisions of the Ley de mineria are simple and wise. They are contained in no more than twenty-seven articles and leave little room for casuistics or embarrassing technicalities."

== See also ==
- Law enforcement in Bolivia
