= Harmony with nature =

Global sustainable development proposal

The term "Harmony with Nature" refers to a principle of amicable and holistic co-existence between humanity and nature. It is used in several contexts, most prominently in relation to sustainable development and the rights of nature, both aimed at addressing anthropogenic environmental crises. In 2009, the United Nations created a program of the same name. Following support from the Bolivian Government, the UN General Assembly approved further resolutions on the topic. Events like the United Nations Earth Summit 2012 have provided a platform for exchange between different stakeholders. Below is the text of the proposal.

== Text of the proposal ==
Preliminary Proposal of the Plurinational State of Bolivia for the United Nations Conference on Sustainable Development (Rio+20)

The achievement of sustainable development in the 21st Century requires a Social and Ecological Contract among human beings and our Mother Earth that brings together and builds upon the progress made in the World Charter for Nature (1982), the Rio Declaration (1992), the Earth Charter (2000), and the World People's Conference on Climate Change and the Rights of Mother Earth (2010).

It would include the following premises:

I. WE ARE BREAKING THE BALANCE OF THE EARTH SYSTEM

1. Twenty years after the "Rio Declaration," it is necessary to update its First Principle such that it would state: "Human beings and nature are at the center of concerns for sustainable development." It is essential to get beyond this anthropocentric vision. Not only do human beings "have the right to a healthy life," but so too does nature, which is the basis of survival for all species including humans.

2. Nature is not just a set of resources that can be exploited, modified, altered, privatized, commercialized and transformed without any consequences. Earth is the only home we have. The Earth does not belong to us; we belong to the Earth.

3. The Earth is a living system. It is an indivisible, interdependent and interrelated community comprised of human beings, nature, the atmosphere, the hydrosphere, and the geosphere. Any substantive alteration of one of its components can affect other areas and the entire system. The Earth is the source of life. It is a system that coordinates physical, chemical, biological and ecological elements in a manner that makes life possible. Through the term Mother Earth, we express this relationship of belonging to a system and respect for our home.

4. Human activity is altering the dynamics and functioning of the Earth system to a degree never before seen. We have exceeded the limits of our system. We have broken harmony with nature. We are living through a series of rising crises that could cause the collapse of the system. It is essential to restore, affirm and guarantee the existence, integrity, interrelation, interaction and regeneration of the Earth system as a whole and of all of its components.

II. SUSTAINABLE DEVELOPMENT IN THE 21ST CENTURY

5. In this century, the two central challenges of sustainable development are to overcome poverty and inequality, and to reestablish balance within the Earth system. Both objectives are intrinsically linked, and one cannot be achieved without the other.

6. It is essential to recognize and affirm that growth has limits. The pursuit of unending development on a finite planet is unsustainable and impossible. It is unsustainable and impossible. The limit to development is defined by the regenerative capacity of the Earth's vital cycles. When growth begins to break that balance, as we see with global warming, we can no longer speak of it as development, but rather, the deterioration and destruction of our home. A certain level of growth and industrialization is needed to satisfy basic needs and guarantee the human rights of a population, but this level of "necessary development" is not about permanent growth, but rather, balance among humans and with nature.

7. Sustainable development seeks to eradicate poverty in order to live well, not generate wealthy people who live at the expense of the poor. The goal is the satisfaction of basic human needs in order to allow for the development of human capabilities and human happiness, strengthening community among human beings and with Mother Earth. In a world in which 1% of the population controls 50% of the wealth of the planet, it will not be possible to eradicate poverty or restore harmony with nature.

8. To end poverty and achieve an equitable distribution of well being, the basic resources and firms should be in the hands of the public sector and society. Only a society that controls its principal sources of income can aspire to a just distribution of the benefits needed to eliminate poverty.

9. The so-called "developed" countries must reduce their levels of over-consumption to reestablish harmony among human beings and with nature, allowing for the sustainable development of all developing countries. The ecological footprint of the developed countries is between 3 and 5 times larger than the average ecological footprint that the Earth system can sustain without an impact on its vital cycles.

10. The developing countries should follow new paradigms different from those used by developed countries in order to attend to the basic needs of their populations and reestablish harmony with nature. It is not sustainable or viable for all countries to follow the example of developed countries without causing our system to collapse.

11. Sustainable development cannot happen only at the national level. The well being of a country is only sustainable if it contributes to the well being of the entire system. The pillar of sustainable development can only be achieved from a global perspective. The so-called developed countries are still far from reaching sustainable development.

III. TOOLS FOR SUSTAINABLE DEVELOPMENT

12. In an interdependent and interconnected system like that of Earth, we cannot recognize the rights of the human part of the system without affecting the rest of the system. To reestablish balance with nature, we must acknowledge its intrinsic value and clearly establish the obligations of humans toward nature, and also recognize that nature has rights that should be respected, promoted, and defended. Just as human beings have rights, the Mother Earth also has the right to exist, the right to maintain its vital cycles, the right to regeneration, the right to be free from structural alteration, and the right to relate to the other parts of the Earth system. Without respecting and guaranteeing the rights of nature, it is not possible to guarantee human rights and achieve sustainable development.

13. We have to end the system of consumption, waste and luxury. Millions of people are dying of hunger in the poorest parts of the globe, while in the richest areas, millions of dollars are spent to combat obesity. We must change the unsustainable patterns of consumption, production, and waste through public policy, regulations, and the conscious and active participation of society. This includes promoting ethics that value human beings for what they are, not what they have.

14. To guarantee the human right to water, education, health, communication, transportation, energy and sanitation, above all in the very poor and marginalized sectors, the provision of these services must be essentially public and based on efficient social management, not private business.

15. States should ensure the right of their populations to proper nutrition by strengthening food sovereignty policies that promote: a) food production by farmers, indigenous peoples and small agricultural producers; b) access to land, water, seeds, credit and other resources for family and community producers; c) the development of social and public enterprises for food production, distribution, and sale that prevent hoarding and contribute to the stability of food prices in domestic markets, thus halting speculative practices and the destruction of local production; d) the right of citizens to define what goods they wish to consume, the origins of those goods and how they are produced; e) consumption of what is necessary and the prioritization of local production; f) practices that contribute to reestablishing harmony with nature, avoiding greater desertification, deforestation, and destruction of biological diversity; g) the promotion of the use of indigenous seeds and traditional knowledge. Food production and commercialization must be socially regulated and cannot be left to free market forces.

16. Without water, there is no life. Humans and all living things have the right to water, but water also has rights. All States and peoples worldwide should work together in solidarity to ensure that loss of vegetation, deforestation, the pollution of the atmosphere and contamination are prevented from continuing to alter the hydrological cycle. These cause desertification, lack of food, temperature increase, sea level rise, migrations, acid rain, and physical-chemical changes that can cause ecosystems to die.

17. Forests are essential to the balance and integrity of planet Earth and a key element in the proper functioning of its ecosystems and the broader system of which we are a part. Thus we cannot consider them as simple providers of goods and services for human beings. The protection, preservation and recuperation of forests is required to reestablish the balance of the Earth system. Forests are not plantations that can be reduced to their capacity to capture carbon and provide environmental services. The maintenance of native forests and woodlands is essential for the water cycle, the atmosphere, biodiversity, the prevention of flooding, and the preservation of ecosystems. Forests are also home to indigenous peoples and communities. The preservation of forests should be pursued through integral and participatory management plans financed with public funding from developed countries.

18. It is essential to guarantee a real and effective reduction of greenhouse gases, particularly on the part of the developed countries historically responsible for climate change, in order to stabilize the increase in temperature to 1 °C during this century. We must therefore strengthen the Kyoto Protocol, not replace it with a more flexible voluntary agreement in which each country does what it chooses. It is necessary to eliminate carbon market mechanisms and offsets so that real domestic reductions are made within the countries with said obligations.

19. All forms of violence against women are incompatible with sustainable development, including violence done to women in militarily occupied territories and domestic or sexual violence that treats women as objects.

20. In order for sustainable development to exist, is essential to guarantee the full application of the United Nations Declaration on the Rights of Indigenous Peoples.

21. Under the framework of common but differentiated responsibilities established in the 1992 Rio Declaration, the so-called developed countries must assume and pay their historical ecological debt for having contributed the most to the deterioration of the Earth system. The payment of this ecological debt to developing countries and the sectors most affected among their own populations consists of the transfer financial resources from public sources and also the effective transfer of appropriate technologies required by developing countries.

22. The resources developed countries dedicate to their defense, security and war budgets should be used to address the effects of climate change and the imbalance with nature. It is inexcusable that 1.5 trillion dollars in public funding are used on these budgets, while, to address the impacts of climate change in developing countries, they want to dedicate just 100 billion dollars from public and private funds as well as market sources by 2020.

23. To address the challenge of achieving sustainable development in the so-called developing countries, a financial transaction tax should be created to help build a Sustainable Development Fund that would be managed by developing countries.

24. Sustainable development requires a new international financial architecture to replace the World Bank and the IMF with entities that are democratic and transparent, that refrain from imposing conditions or structural adjustments, are controlled by the developing countries, and are based on the principles of solidarity and complementarity rather than commercialization and privatization.

25. It is essential to promote the exchange of scientific and technical knowledge and to remove intellectual property barriers to allow a true transfer of environmentally friendly technologies from developed countries to developing countries. An effective Technology Transfer Mechanism should be created based on the need for socially, culturally, and ecologically appropriate technologies in the countries of the South. This mechanism should not be a showcase for the sale of technologies by rich countries.

26. Intellectual property rights over genes, microorganisms and other forms of life are a threat to food sovereignty, biodiversity, access to medicine and other basic elements of the survival of low-income populations. All forms of intellectual property over life should be abolished.

27. Gross Domestic Product is not an adequate means of measuring the development and well being of a society. Thus it is necessary to create indicators for measuring the environmental destruction caused by certain economic activities in order to advance toward sustainable development in harmony with nature, integrating social and environmental aspects that are not aimed at the commercialization of nature and its functions.

28. Respect for the sovereignty of States is essential in the management and protection of nature under the framework of cooperation among States.

29. There is no single solution for all peoples. Human beings are diverse. Our peoples have their own unique cultures and identities. To destroy a culture is to threaten the identity of an entire people. Capitalism attempts to homogenize us all to convert us into consumers. There has not been, nor will there ever be, a single model for life that can save the world. We live and act in a pluralistic world, and a pluralistic world should respect diversity, which is itself synonymous with life. Respect for peaceful and harmonious complementarity among the diverse cultures and economies, without exploitation or discrimination against any single one, is essential for saving the planet, humanity, and life.

30. Peace is essential for sustainable development. There is no worse aggression against humanity and Mother Earth than war and violence. War destroys life. Nobody and nothing is safe from war. Those that fight suffer, as do those that are forced to go without bread in order to feed the war. Wars squander life and natural resources.

31. An International Tribunal of Environmental and Climate Justice must be established to judge and sanction crimes against nature that transcend national borders, violating the rights of nature and affecting humanity.

32. The problems affecting humanity and nature are global in nature, and to address them requires the exercise of global democracy through the development of mechanisms of consultation and decision-making such as referendums, plebiscites, or popular consultations so that the citizens of the world as a whole may speak.

33. Sustainable development is incompatible with all forms of imperialism and neocolonialism. It is essential to end the imposition of conditionalities, military interventions, coups and different forms of blackmail in order to stop imperialism and neocolonialism.

34. The collective global response needed to confront the crisis we face requires structural changes. We must change the system, not the climate or the Earth system. In the hands of capitalism, everything is converted into merchandise: water, earth genomes, ancestral cultures, justice, ethics, life. It is essential to develop a pluralistic system based on the culture of life and harmony among human beings and with nature; a system that promotes sustainable development in the framework of solidarity, complementarity, equity, social and economic justice, social participation, respect for diversity, and peace.

IV. DANGEROUS AND FALSE SOLUTIONS

35. Not all that glitters is gold. Not all that is labeled "green" is environmentally friendly. We must use the precautionary principle and deeply analyze the different "green" alternatives that are presented before proceeding with their experimentation and implementation.

36. Nature cannot be subject to manipulation by new technologies without consequences in the future. History shows us that many dangerous technologies have been released in the market before their environmental or health impacts are known, or before their social and economic impacts on poor people and developing countries are understood. This is currently the case with genetically modified organisms, agrochemicals, biofuels, nanotechnology, and synthetic biology. These technologies should be avoided.

37. Geoengineering and all forms of artificial manipulation of the climate should be prohibited, for they bring the enormous risk of further destabilizing the climate, biodiversity and nature.

38. It is necessary to create public and multilateral mechanisms within the United Nations to evaluate in an independent manner and without conflict of interest the potential environmental, health, social, and economic impacts of new technologies before they are spread. This mechanism must involve transparency and social participation by potentially affected groups.

39. The current ecological and climate crisis has put in jeopardy all of life on planet Earth, and thus it requires deep solutions based on the real causes of the climate crisis. It cannot be reduced to a simple market failure, which is a reductionist and narrow view.

40. The solution is not to put a price on nature. Nature is not a form of capital. The green economy should not distort the fundamental principles of sustainable development. It is wrong to say that we only value that which has a price, an owner, and brings profits. The market mechanisms that permit exchange among human beings and nations have proven incapable of contributing to an equitable distribution of wealth. To use an approach based on market principles and private appropriation to try to resolve the problem of inequality – itself a product of capitalism – is like trying to put out a fire with gasoline.

41. It is wrong to fragment nature into "environmental services" with a monetary value for market exchange. It is wrong to put a price on the capacity of forests to act as carbon sinks, and worse to promote their commercialization as does REDD (Reducing Emissions from Deforestation and Forest Degradation). The market for carbon credits based on forests will lead to: a) noncompliance with effective emission reduction commitments by developed countries; b) the bulk of resources being appropriated by intermediaries and financial entities and rarely benefiting countries, indigenous peoples and forests themselves; c) the generation of speculative bubbles based on the sale and purchase of said certificates; and d) the establishment of new property rights over the capacity of forests to capture carbon dioxide, which will clash with the sovereign rights of States and the indigenous peoples that live in forests. To promote market mechanisms based on the economic needs of developing countries is a new form of neocolonialism.

42. "Green" capitalism will bring about natural resource grabbing, displacing humanity and nature from the essential elements needed for their survival. The drive for profit, instead of reestablishing harmony within the system, will provoke even greater imbalances, concentrations of wealth, and speculative processes.

V. GLOBAL GOVERNMENT AND SOCIAL PARTICIPATION

43. It is necessary to establish a United Nations organization to promote sustainable development in harmony with nature. This organization should articulate and unite the different authorities involved in order to avoid overlapping efforts and achieve effective coordination. Developing countries should have majority representation in said organization, and its functioning should be democratic, transparent, and accountable.

44. This organization should articulate all of the conventions regarding nature without leaving aside issues central to the United Nations, such as water.

45. Social participation is essential in this new organization. Workers, women, farmers, indigenous peoples, young people, scientists, and all sectors of society should be represented. The private sector cannot have the same amount of influence as the social sectors, given that, by definition, its goal is to create profit rather than social wellbeing. Effective mechanisms for interaction among all social actors are required.

== See also ==
- Rights of nature
- Naturales quaestiones
- Sumak Kawsay
