= Public Herald =

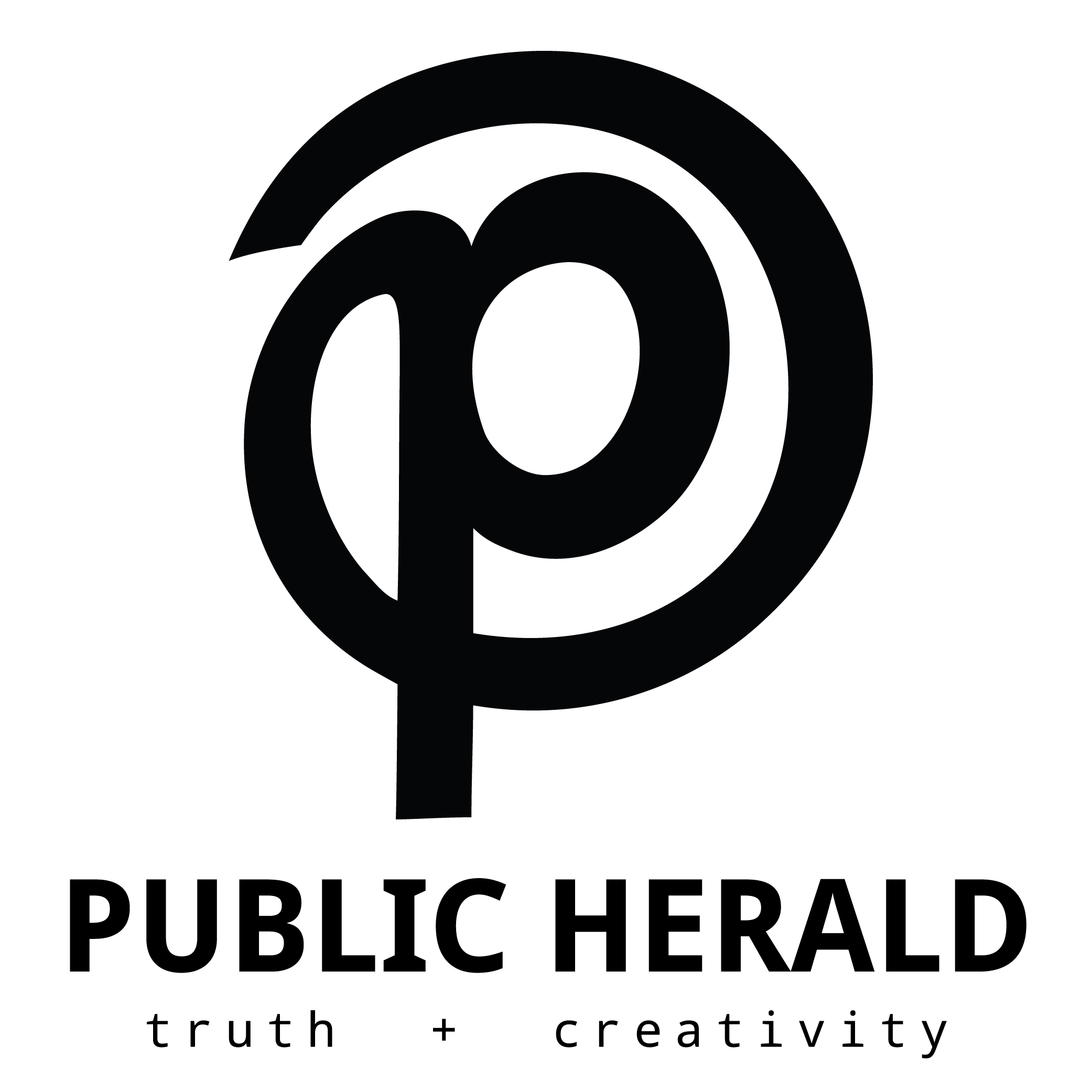
- Founded: 2011
- Founder: Joshua Boaz Pribanic and Melissa Troutman
- Type: nonprofit
- Purpose: Investigative Journalism
- Location: P.O. Box 488, Coudersport, PA 16915
- Website: PublicHerald.org

Public Herald is a non-profit investigative news organization based in Pittsburgh, Pennsylvania. Launched in 2011 by Joshua Pribanic and Melissa Troutman, Public Herald is known for their investigative reporting on fracking activity and its effect on water in Pennsylvania. Their slogan is, "media by and for the public interests."

Public Herald has been active in environmental issues, publishing the films “Triple Divide", “Triple Divide [Redacted]”, and "Invisible Hand", and producing reports on fracking and its effects on groundwater in Pennsylvania. Public Herald also launched Fileroom.org, which collects information on oil and gas and makes those records available online so they are accessible to both the public and journalists.

The works of Public Herald have had widespread coverage in environmental journalism, editorials, and major news media, including NPR Marketplace, Rolling Stone, The Washington Post, and The New York Times. Their work has also been referenced in the books "Amity and Prosperity: One Family and the Fracturing of America" by Eliza Griswold, "Legal Rights for Rivers: Competition, Collaboration and Water Governance" by Erin O'Donnell and "Sustainability and the Rights of Nature: An Introduction" by Cameron La Follette, Chris Maser.

== Films and investigative reports ==
In 2013, Public Herald released the film "Triple Divide" which documented regulator misconduct surrounding the controversial practice of fracking.

On September 21, 2015, Public Herald released a report titled "Ways Pennsylvania DEP Water Contamination Cases Related to Fracking are “Cooked”.

In 2017, Public Herald released its second feature-length documentary, “Triple Divide [Redacted] which expanded on what was covered in "Triple"Divide".

In 2020, Public Herald released a documentary titled "Invisible Hand" which focuses on the story of Rights of Nature through Grant Township, previously reported by Public Herald. The film discusses democracy, capitalism, and rights of nature. Mark Ruffalo is the executive producer for INVISIBLE HAND, and narrator of all 3 films. The films are directed by Melissa Troutman and Joshua Boaz Pribanic.

PublicHerald.org reports have been cited by multiple academic articles

== #fileroom ==
In 2015, Public Herald created the online resource #fileroom, located at publicfiles.org, to collect information about oil and gas which is open to the public and journalists to contribute to or access. There are categories for complaints, permits, waste, GMI (Gas Migration Investigation), and a legal section for court cases and law that is related oil/gas in Pennsylvania or the Department of Environmental Protection.

== Awards and funding ==
In 2014, The Investigative News Network & the Knight Foundation awarded $35,000 through the Innovation Fund for the work on "Triple Divide".

Awards and Festivals

- 2021 Red Nation International Film Festival
- 2021 Gold Winner Telly Awards for non-broadcast feature documentary (INVISIBLE HAND)
- 2021 Award Winner for Best Feature Documentary, Colorado Activism Film Festival (INVISIBLE HAND)
- 2021 Audience Award Common Good International Film Festival
- 2021 Spotlight Documentary Film Awards’ Gold Award (INVISIBLE HAND)
- 2021 Official Selection Blackbird Film Festival (INVISIBLE HAND)
- 2021 Official Selection Transitions Film Festival (INVISIBLE HAND)
- 2021 Official Selection Common Good International Film Festival (INVISIBLE HAND)
- 2021 Official Selection Water Docs Film Festival
- 2020 Grand Prize Humanitarian Award from Accolade Global Film Competition (INVISIBLE HAND)
- 2020 Best Documentary Feature from the Hollywood Verge Film Awards (INVISIBLE HAND)
- 2020 Accolade Global Film Competition Award of Excellence for Documentary (INVISIBLE HAND)
- 2020 Official Selection Columbus International Film Festival (INVISIBLE HAND)
- 2020 Official Selection Princeton Environmental Film Festival (INVISIBLE HAND)
- 2020 Official Selection Around Paris International Film Festival (INVISIBLE HAND
- 2020 Official Selection Duquesne Human Rights International Film Series (INVISIBLE HAND)
- 2019 Official Selection Adirondack International Film Festival (INVISIBLE HAND)
- Humanitarian Award, Accolade Global Film Competition (Triple Divide)
- People's Choice Award, Real to Reel Film Festival (Triple Divide)
- Award of Merit, Accolade Global Film Competition (Triple Divide)
- Runner Up, Audience Award, Reading Film Fest (Triple Divide Redacted)
- Official Selection New York Film & TV Festival (Triple Divide)
- Official Selection Maryland International Film Festival (Triple Divide)
- Official Selection Erie International Film Festival (Triple Divide)
- Official Selection Colorado Environmental Film Festival (Triple Divide Redacted)
- Official Selection Harrisburg-Hershey Film Festival (Triple Divide Redacted)
- Official Selection Oil Valley International Film Festival (Triple Divide Redacted)
