= Florida Right to Clean Water =

Environmental organization

Florida right to clean water.org logo

Florida Right To Clean Water.org is a grassroots, volunteer, nonpartisan organization formed to place an amendment to the state constitution by citizens before the voters of the U.S. state of Florida, using a direct initiative that will give citizens of the state a right to clean and healthy waters. The organization consists of volunteers. They gather signatures of registered voters on petitions confirming the desire of the voter that the amendment be placed on the ballot by the secretary of state so all Florida voters may decide whether to adopt the amendment. The petitions are submitted to local election officials by the volunteers. Every county in the state has a supervisor of elections who reviews the submitted petitions for that county in order to determine that they are completed correctly and that the signers are registered voters in that county. The supervisor reports the numbers that have been verified to state officials.

== The direct initiative ==
According to Ballotpedia, the Florida Department of Elections states that the 2024 initiative intended to create a "fundamental right to clean and healthy waters", (as defined) in the state constitution and to give legal standing to residents, non-governmental organizations, or government entities enabling them to sue in order to enforce or defend such rights. The official summary of the initiative provides a short explanation, "This amendment creates a fundamental right to clean and healthy waters. The amendment may be used to sue State executive agencies for harm or threatened harm to Florida's waters, which include aquatic ecosystems. This amendment defines terms, identifies affected constitutional provisions in Article IV governing the executive branch, provides for civil action enforcement, allows attorney's and expert witness fees to prevailing plaintiffs, and provides equitable remedies including restoration of waters."

The Florida Wildlife Federation, an affiliate of the National Wildlife Federation, declared the initiative a watershed moment for the state because it is a stopgap, assuring that no more degradation of state waters will be tolerated and that passage will provide oversight to prevent pollution of state waters. The initiative is supported by local environmental organizations such as the nonprofit Calusa Waterkeeper as well as by civic groups, neighborhood councils, and veterans groups. The proposed amendment is considered a "Green Amendment" by the Green Amendments For The Generations initiative. Lists and a display of logos of the diverse organizations that support putting the amendment before all of Florida voters on the ballot are being updated regularly on the organization site.

== History ==
The organization was formed following a successful campaign in Orange County by a similar volunteer organization of citizens that worked on getting an amendment to the charter of that county to its voters. The amendment was approved by 89.2 percent of the voters of the county when it was presented to them for consideration on their 2020 ballot. That was the first such county charter amendment in the United States to provide a legal basis to protect the waters within its boundaries. It garnered recognition from advocates of conservation throughout the country, leading Jim Hightower of Texas, the author of The Hightower Lowdown, to declare that "the epicenter of today's Rights of Nature political movement" was in Florida.

That the objective of the organization, to allow voters to consider granting the right to clean and healthy waters to all Floridians, is similar to the rights of nature the voters of Orange County granted to themselves was acknowledged by Craig Pittman of the Florida Phoenix, who reports on state issues and is the author of several books related to Florida issues and history. However, differences exist between the two initiatives that prevent this initiative from being characterized as a rights of nature amendment. The constitutional right to clean waters granted by the FRTCW amendment will be to the citizens of the state of Florida.

The proposed amendment is crafted to create a means by state law to enforce conservation measures of the type Florida voters have repeatedly supported, but which often have not been enacted or funded by legislators.

=== Proposed 2024 amendment ===
The direct initiative campaign was launched on April 22, 2022, the date the state approved the language of the proposed amendment.[7] To be placed on the ballot, 891,589 valid petition signatures will have to be presented to the state before the February 1, 2024, deadline.

Local news media have published articles, columns, and letters to the editor supporting the newly introduced initiative, such as Why we need the Florida Right to Clean and Healthy Waters Amendment by Jim Tatum that appeared in The Gainesville Sun on May 24.

The League of Women Voters of Florida announced that they joined the Florida Right To Clean and Healthy Waters campaign in order "to support getting a constitutional amendment on the ballot in 2024 for civil action to enforce our right to clean and healthy waters in Florida", stating further that the amendment "is a stopgap, declaring that 'no more harm' will be allowed to our waters. The campaign’s mission is to take this to Florida’s voters; to educate them, to collect their petitions, and to ensure their voice is heard." Every local LWV in Florida is participating. The number of signatures by registered Florida Voters that is required, amounts to almost 900,000 statewide and they must be collected by November 2023 in order to qualify the amendment by February 2024 for the 2024 ballot.

On February 15, 2023, the board of county commissioners for Alachua County voted to support the proposed amendment, making it the first county in the state to lend its support for adoption of the proposed amendment. After a unanimous vote by the board, the adoption was signed into effect by its chair, Anna Prizzia.

Although coverage of development of the initiative campaign began much earlier, by May 2023 media attention to it began to generate positive opinions among respected community commentators such as Glenn Compton of Manasota88 in The Bradenton Times in Manatee County and Carrie Seidman of the Herald-Tribune in Sarasota County as well as the endorsements of historic and civically active neighborhood associations such as Indian Beach-Sapphire Shores and Laurel Park in Sarasota. The heightened interest also prompted local businesses in Sarasota to begin providing locations for distribution of yard signs and copies of the petition to be signed and submitted in order for the proposed amendment to qualify for placement on the ballot. Similar activities in the sixty-seven counties of the state would be necessary to generate the high numbers now required since the doubling of qualification thresholds for citizen-initiated amendments to the state constitution by the state legislature following the success of the Orange County charter amendment. That amount was not reached in the amendment cycle prior to the 2024 election.

=== Proposed 2026 amendment ===
The number of signatures gathered in a purely volunteer campaign proved the interest of state voters for the amendment, however, and encouraged initiation of a second leg to the clean water campaign by the organization to follow immediately. A second proposed amendment process was begun taking advantage of the network of volunteers and supporters established prior to the new deadline. The second leg of the clean water campaign is for placement of a proposed constitutional amendment before the voters on the 2026 ballot and began in March 2024. Gathering begins from scratch, entirely new petitions must be submitted that are signed within a newly-stipulated collection time in order to qualify for placement on the ballot for the 2026 election. Gathering begins from scratch, entirely new petitions must be submitted that are signed within the two-year election cycle to qualify for placement on the ballot for the 2026 election.

The updated ballot summary of the 2026 ballot proposal is printed on each petition and states as its intention, that the proposed amendment "creates an enforceable, fundamental right to clean and healthy waters, authorizing a person to sue for equitable relief when a state executive agency, by action or inaction, allows harm or threat of harm to Florida waters". The summary continues that the proposed amendment "provides for strict judicial scrutiny of such action or inaction; adds to available remedies; identifies affected constitutional provisions; provides for enforcement; defines terms; and requires attorney's fees and costs to prevailing plaintiffs".

== See also ==
- Rights of Nature, United States, Orange County, Florida
