= Framework Law of Mother Earth and Integral Development for Living Well =

The Framework Law of Mother Earth and Integral Development for Living Well (Spanish: La Ley Marco de la Madre Tierra y Desarrollo Integral para Vivir Bien) is a Bolivian law (Law 300 of the Plurinational State) enacted on October 15, 2012. It is the successor to the Law of the Rights of Mother Earth and was initially designed as the full version of that law. According to Derrick Hindery, "the law clearly reflects both the more environmentally progressive ideals pushed by the Unity Pact and the extractivist agenda of the Morales administration."

The law authorizes the creation of new institutions:

- A Mother Earth Ombudsman's Office (Spanish: Defensoria de la Madre Tierra) parallel to the human rights-oriented Defensoría del Pueblo. As of February 2016, this office has not been created.
- The Plurinational Mother Earth Authority (Spanish: Autoridad Plurinacional de la Madre Tierra; APMT), which oversees climate change policies, was created by Supreme Decree 1696 in 2013.
