= Law of the Rights of Mother Earth =

Bolivian law

Plurinational Legislative Assembly of Bolivia
- Enacted: December 2010

The Law of the Rights of Mother Earth (Spanish: Ley de Derechos de la Madre Tierra) is a Bolivian law (Law 071 of the Plurinational State), that was passed by Bolivia's Plurinational Legislative Assembly in December 2010. This 10 article law is derived from the first part of a longer draft bill, drafted and released by the Pact of Unity by November 2010.

The law defines Mother Earth as "a collective subject of public interest," and declares both Mother Earth and life-systems (which combine human communities and ecosystems) as titleholders of inherent rights specified in the law. The short law proclaims the creation of the Defensoría de la Madre Tierra a counterpart to the human rights ombudsman office known as the Defensoría del Pueblo, but leaves its structuring and creation to future legislation.

A heavily revised version of the longer bill was passed as the Framework Law of Mother Earth and Integral Development for Living Well (Spanish: La Ley Marco de la Madre Tierra y Desarrollo Integral para Vivir Bien; Law 300) on October 15, 2012.

== Investing nature with rights ==
The law defines Mother Earth as "...the dynamic living system formed by the indivisible community of all life systems and living beings whom are interrelated, interdependent, and complementary, which share a common destiny; adding that "Mother Earth is considered sacred in the worldview of Indigenous peoples and nations.

In this approach human beings and their communities are considered a part of mother earth, by being integrated in "Life systems" defined as "...complex and dynamic communities of plants, animals, micro-organisms and other beings in their environment, in which human communities and the rest of nature interact as a functional unit, under the influence of climatic, physiographic and geologic factors, as well as the productive practices and cultural diversity of Bolivians of both genders, and the world views of Indigenous nations and peoples, intercultural communities and the Afro-Bolivians. This definition can be seen as a more inclusive definition of ecosystems because it explicitly includes the social, cultural and economic dimensions of human communities.

The law also establishes the juridical character of Mother Earth as a "collective subject of public interest", to ensure the exercise and protection of her rights. By giving Mother Earth a legal personality, it can, through its representatives (humans), bring an action to defend its rights. Additionally, to say that Mother Earth is of public interest represents a major shift from an anthropocentric perspective to a more Earth community based perspective.

== Content ==
The law enumerates seven specific rights to which Mother Earth and her constituent life systems, including human communities, are entitled:

- To life: It is the right to the maintenance of the integrity of life systems and natural processes which sustain them, as well as the capacities and conditions for their renewal
- To the Diversity of Life: It is the right to the preservation of the differentiation and variety of the beings that comprise Mother Earth, without being genetically altered, nor artificially modified in their structure, in such a manner that threatens their existence, functioning and future potential
- To water: It is the right of the preservation of the quality and composition of water to sustain life systems and their protection with regards to contamination, for renewal of the life of Mother Earth and all its components
- To clean air: It is the right of the preservation of the quality and composition of air to sustain life systems and their protection with regards to contamination, for renewal of the life of Mother Earth and all its components
- To equilibrium: It is the right to maintenance or restoration of the inter-relation, interdependence, ability to complement and functionality of the components of Mother Earth, in a balanced manner for the continuation of its cycles and the renewal of its vital processes
- To restoration: It is the right to the effective and opportune restoration of life systems affected by direct or indirect human activities
- To live free of contamination: It is the right for preservation of Mother Earth and any of its components with regards to toxic and radioactive waste generated by human activities

== Drafting and legislative process ==
The Pact of Unity (which gathers the major Bolivian indigenous and campesino organizations) drafted the long version of the Law between the April 2010 World People's Conference on Climate Change and the Rights of Mother Earth and October 2010, when they finished the final version in a joined effort with a commission of the Plurinational Legislative Assembly, the Bolivian Vice-Ministry of Environment, and a legal team of constitutional development from the Vice President's Office. Later, a ten-article short version was agreed upon with then Senator Freddy Bersatti and Deputy Galo Silvestre, to be passed by the Legislative Assembly in December 2010. The short version was rushed so as to be presented by president Evo Morales at the 2010 United Nations Climate Change Conference.

The Framework Law was expected to be considered by the Assembly in 2011, but was not. In February 2012, Senator Eugenio Rojas, who heads the governing party's delegation, describes the law as among six priorities for early passage in 2012. It was passed in October 2012.

== Precedent ==
The law is considered to be the first national environmental law, other than Ecuador's 2008 constitutional provision, to recognize the rights of a natural entity. It may also allow for citizens to sue individuals and groups as part of "Mother Earth" in response to real and alleged infringements of its integrity. Thus far, however, the impact of this law appears to be limited.

== See also ==
- Animal rights
- Framework Law of Mother Earth and Integral Development for Living Well (successor to this law)
- Great ape personhood
- Legal personality
- Pachamama
- Plant rights
- Rights of Nature
