= Environmental personhood =

Legal concept

Environmental personhood or juridic personhood is a legal concept which designates certain environmental entities the status of a legal person. This assigns to these entities, the rights, protections, privileges, responsibilities and legal liability of a legal personality. Because environmental entities such as rivers and plants can not represent themselves in court, a "guardian" can act on the entity's behalf to protect it. Environmental personhood emerged from the evolution of legal focus in pursuit of the protection of nature. Over time, focus has evolved from human interests in exploiting nature, to protecting nature for future human generations, to conceptions that allow for nature to be protected as intrinsically valuable. This concept can be used as a vehicle for recognising Indigenous peoples' relationships to natural entities, such as rivers. Environmental personhood, which assigns nature (or aspects of it) certain rights, concurrently provides a means to individuals or groups such as Indigenous peoples to fulfill their human rights.

== Background ==
The United States Professor Christopher D. Stone first discussed the idea of attributing legal personality to natural objects in the 1970s, in his article "Should trees have standing? Towards legal rights for natural objects". A legal person cannot be owned; therefore, no ownership can be attributed to an environmental entity with established legal personality. Standing is directly related to legal personality. Entities with standing, or locus standi, have the right or capacity to bring action or appear in court. Environmental entities cannot themselves bring action or appear in court. However, this action or standing can be achieved on behalf of the entity by a representing legal guardian. Representation could increase protection of culturally significant aspects of the natural environment, or areas vulnerable to exploitation and pollution.

Although there is no federal law in the United States implementing environmental personhood, the idea has been advocated for by a US Supreme Court Justice. In the decision of the 1972 US Supreme Court case Sierra Club v. Morton, Justice William Douglas wrote a dissenting opinion arguing that certain "environmental elements" should have locus standi, and that people with a meaningful relationship to that environmental element should be able to act on its behalf for its protection. As of June 2021, at least 53 initiatives in 12 countries have used the concept of 'person' in their legal text.

The Sierra Club, an environmental advocacy group, brought this suit against then Secretary of the Interior of the United States, Roger C. B. Morton stating that the federal government, according to the Administrative Procedure Act, could not grant permits for developers to build infrastructure – specifically a highway, powerlines, and a ski resort – in the Mineral King Valley, part of the Sequoia National Forest. The Sierra Club aimed to protect this undeveloped land within the national forest, but the U.S. Court of Appeals for the Ninth Circuit had stated that because the members of the Sierra Club would not be directly affected they could not sue under the Administrative Procedure Act, which "provides standards for judicial review" for instances where a person is negatively impacted by an agency action, such as granting a permit. The Supreme Court agreed that the Sierra Club could not sue under the Administrative Procedure Act, as it could not show that the actions of the defendant caused or would cause injury to its members. This ruling led Supreme Court Justice William Douglas to write his dissenting opinion, arguing that people should be allowed to sue on behalf of non-living things writing, "[t]hose who have that intimate relation with the inanimate object about to be injured, polluted, or otherwise despoiled are its legitimate spokesmen." This opinion is shared by those who continue to argue for environmental personhood in the United States and around the world.

== Domestic rights of nature ==
=== New Zealand ===
In 2014, Te Urewera National Park was declared Te Urewera, an environmental legal entity. The area encompassed by Te Urewera ceased to be a government-owned national park and was transformed into freehold, inalienable land owned by itself.

Following the same trend, New Zealand's Whanganui River was declared to be a legal person in 2017. This new legal entity was named Te Awa Tupua and is now recognised as "an indivisible and living whole from the mountains to the sea, incorporating the Whanganui River and all of its physical and metaphysical elements." The river would be represented by two guardians, one from the Whanganui iwi and the other from the Crown.

Also in 2017, the New Zealand government signed an agreement granting similar legal personality to Mount Taranaki and pledging a name change for Egmont National Park, which surrounds the mountain.

=== India ===
The Ganges and Yamuna Rivers are now considered legal persons in an effort to combat pollution. The rivers are sacred to Hindu culture for their healing powers and attraction of pilgrims who bathe and scatter the ashes of their dead. The rivers have been heavily polluted by 1.5 billion litres of untreated sewage and 500 million litres of industrial waste entering the rivers daily.

The High Court in the northern Indian state of Uttarakhand ordered in March 2017 that the Ganges and its main tributary, the Yamuna, be assigned the status of legal entities. The rivers would gain "all corresponding rights, duties and liabilities of a living person." This decision meant that polluting or damaging the rivers is equivalent to harming a person. The court cited the example of the New Zealand Whanganui River, which was also declared to possess full rights of a legal person.

This development of environmental personhood has been met with scepticism as merely announcing that the Ganges and Yamuna are living entities will not save them from significant, ongoing pollution. There is a possible need to change long-held cultural attitudes towards the Ganges, which hold that the river has self-purifying properties.

There is further criticism that the guardianship of the rivers was only granted to Uttarakhand, a region in northern India which houses a small part of the rivers' full extent. The Ganges flows for 2,525 km through Uttarakhand, Uttar Pradesh, Bihar, Jharkhand and West Bengal, with only a 96 km stretch running through Uttarakhand. Only a small section of the 1,376 km Yamuna tributary runs through Uttarakhand – which also crosses through the states of Haryana, Himachal Pradesh, Delhi and Uttar Pradesh.

Regardless of scepticism surrounding the decision of the Uttarakhand High Court, proclaiming these vulnerable rivers as legal entities invokes a movement of change towards environmental and cultural rights protection. The decisions may be built upon as a foundation for future environmental legislative change.

=== United States ===
In 2006, the borough of Tamaqua, Pennsylvania, worked with a rights of nature group called the Community Environmental Legal Defense Fund (CELDF). Together, the groups drafted legislation to protect the community and its environment from the dumping of toxic sewage. Since 2006, CELDF has assisted with over 30 communities in ten states across the United States to develop local laws codifying the rights of nature. CELDF also assisted in the drafting of Ecuador's 2008 constitution following a national referendum.

Besides Tamaqua, several other towns throughout the United States have drafted legislation that would, in effect, give nature natural rights. In 2008, residents in a town by the name of Shapleigh, Maine, added new provisions to the town's legal code. The new sections granted rights to the nature and natural bodies of water that surrounded Shapleigh, and purported to strip the rights of corporations granted by the United States Constitution. What prompted the change to Shapleigh's legal code was a plan by the Nestle Corporation, which owns several water bottle brands such as Poland Spring, to pump truckloads of groundwater from Shapleigh to a water bottling facility. As of 2019, no lawsuits have been filed against Shapleigh, Maine for the change in the town's legal code, and the Nestle Corporation has not chosen to challenge the code either. In this case the CELDF did not assist the residents of Shapleigh in drafting sections 99-11 and 99-12 of their legal code, they were instead assisted by lawyers from Vermont.

In April 2013, the CELDF assisted officials in Mora County, New Mexico, in creating an ordinance that limited the ability of corporations to extract gas and oil, and gave rights to the natural ecosystems and bodies of water that resided within Mora County. This ordinance made Mora County the very first place within the United States to ban the production of gas and oil, within a certain area, in an official statement. A lawsuit was filed against Mora County on November 12, 2013, which asserted that Mora County's ordinance infringed on corporations rights, especially the first, fifth, and fourteenth amendments. In January 2015, Mora County's ordinance was overthrown by U.S. District Judge James O. Browning as he viewed the ordinance to violate the first amendment rights of corporations.

In early 2014, Grant Township, Indiana, Pennsylvania, enlisted the CELDF's help in drafting an ordinance that would give the natural bodies of water surrounding Grant Township natural rights. A company named Pennsylvania General Energy (PGE) had converted an old oil and gas well into a "wastewater injection well," and residents became concerned for what that could mean for the natural ecosystems surrounding their township. The water in a wastewater injection well is waste that is left over from a process called fracking. This water can contain harmful pollutants and chemicals that can poison groundwater. In Grant Township, most residents rely on the Little Mahoning Creek for their water needs. If the wastewater injection well were to leak, there is a possibility it could contaminate the Little Mahoning. The risk of contamination is what prompted Grant Township residents to ask the CELDF for assistance in drafting an ordinance. Grant Township's ordinance gave natural rights to the ecosystems and bodies of water that were within the borders of Grant Township. Grant Township's ordinance also stripped corporations of their rights deeming that corporations would not be seen as "persons" within the borders of Grant Township. In August 2014, PGE sued Grant Township which began a legal battle that would last for almost five years. Grant Township lost the lawsuit against PGE in April 2019, and Judge Susan Baxter ordered Grant Township to pay PGE's legal expenses which were over $100,000. In addition, Grant Township's ordinance was declared invalid.

On 26 February 2019, voters in Toledo, Ohio passed the Lake Erie Bill of Rights. The main point of the Lake Erie Bill of Rights is that Lake Erie has the right to "flourish." Residents of Toledo, and surrounding areas, have suffered times where the tap water, which comes from Lake Erie, was not safe to drink, or use, due to pollution. Cases of unsafe water conditions, amongst other pollution problems, is what prompted residents of Toledo to ask the CELDF for help. On 27 February 2019, the day after the Lake Erie Bill of Rights was passed by voters, a lawsuit was filed by an Ohio farmer. On 27 February 2020, U.S. District Judge Jack Zouhary invalidated the bill, ruling it was "unconstitutionally vague" and beyond "the power of municipal government in Ohio."

In the summer of 2019, the Yurok tribe in northern California gave the Klamath River personhood status.

=== Ecuador ===
The rights of nature "to exist, persist, maintain and regenerate its vital cycles" have been proclaimed under Ecuador's 2008 constitution. This occurred after a national referendum in 2008, allowing the Ecuador constitution to reflect rights for nature, a world first. Every person and community has the right to advocate on nature's behalf. The Constitution proclaims that the "State shall give incentives to natural persons and legal entities and to communities to protect nature and to promote respect for all the elements comprising an ecosystem."

The first successful case of the rights of nature implementation under Ecuador constitutional law was presented before the Provincial Court of Justice of Loja in 2011. This case involved the Vilcabamba River as the plaintiff, representing itself with its own rights to 'exist' and 'maintain itself' – as it attempted to halt construction of a government highway project interfering with the natural health of the river. This case was brought before court by two individuals, Richard Frederick Wheeler and Eleanor Geer Huddle, as legal guardians acting in favour of nature – specifically the Vilcabamba River. A constitutional injunction was granted in favour of the Vilcabamba River and against the Provincial government of Loja, attempting to conduct the environmentally-harmful project. The project was forced to be halted and the area was to be rehabilitated.

=== Bolivia ===
The constitutional change in Ecuador was followed legislatively by Bolivia in 2010, passing the 'Law of the Rights of Mother Earth' (Ley de Derechos de la Madre Tierra). This legislation designates Mother Earth the character of 'a collective subject of public interest' with inherent rights specified in the law. The Law of the Rights of Mother Earth give aspects of legal personhood to the natural environment. Judicial action can be taken for infringements against individuals and groups as part of Mother Earth as 'a collective subject of public interest'. The legislation states that "Mother Earth is the dynamic living system made up of the indivisible community of all living systems, living, interrelated, interdependent and complementary, sharing a common destiny."

=== Colombia ===
The Colombia Constitutional Court found in November 2016 that the Atrato River basin possesses rights to "protection, conservation, maintenance, and restoration." This ruling came about as a result of degradation to the river basin from mining, impacting nature and harming of Indigenous peoples and their culture. The court referred to the New Zealand declaration of the Whanganui River as a legal person holding environmental personhood. The court ordered that joint guardianship would be undertaken in the representation of the Atrato River basin. Similarly to the New Zealand declaration, the representatives would come from the national government and the Indigenous people living in the basin.

The court stated:

(I)t is the human populations that are interdependent of the natural world – and not the opposite – and that they must assume the consequences of their actions and omissions with the nature. It is a question of understanding this new sociopolitical reality with the aim of achieving a respectful transformation with the natural world and its environment, as has happened before with civil and political rights…Now is the time to begin taking the first steps to effectively protect the planet and its resources before it is too late...

In April 2018 the Supreme Court of Colombia has issued a decision recognizing the Amazon River ecosystem as a subject of rights and beneficiary of protection.

=== Canada ===
The Magpie river in the Côte-Nord region of Quebec was given a set of rights, including the right to take legal action, by the Innu Council of Ekanitshit and Minganie county. Representatives can be appointed by the regional municipality and the Innu to act on behalf of the river and take legal action to protect its rights which they define as: "the right to flow; the right to respect for its cycles; the right for its natural evolution to be protected and preserved; the right to maintain its natural biodiversity; the right to fulfil its essential functions within its ecosystem; the right to maintain its integrity; the right to be safe from pollution; the right to regenerate and be restored; and finally, the right to sue." This aligns with the belief that the river is an independent, living entity separate from human activity.

=== Spain ===
On September 30, 2022, the Parliament of Spain passed Law 19/2022, recognizing the legal personhood of the Mar Menor and its basin, thus becoming the first ecosystem in Europe with its own rights.

== Arguments for and against ==
The concept of environmental personhood is controversial, even among environmentalists. One can advocate for a legal framework that acknowledges rights of nature, but may not believe that environmental personhood is the right way to implement it. Proponents of environmental personhood argue that it is valuable to be able to sue on behalf of the environment, because it would allow for environmental protection that does not rely on harm being done to human beings. Environmental personhood also better honors the significant relationships of Indigenous peoples to their environment.

However, there are arguments against the concept of environmental personhood. One concern is that the status of legal personhood implies a right not only to sue but to be sued. For example, it has been questioned how legal liability applies to a natural entity (e.g., in natural disasters), and whether legal representatives of such an entity would or should be held liable for environmental persons. Community Environmental Defense Fund lawyer Lindsey Schromen-Wawrin writes that this concern is "one of the things that could derail in my opinion the ability for rights in nature to be a check on destructive activities and instead could set up kind of like natural resource trustees for ecosystems where there's a flood and now the ecosystem has to pay out of the fund that would otherwise have gone to restoring habitat that had been destroyed."

Another concern is that even with a legal right to sue on behalf of a natural entity, lawsuits are expensive. There are issues of environmental justice if the cost to exercise the right to sue is inaccessible. Other issues arise when environmental entities exist beyond the bounds of the jurisdiction that decided on environmental personhood, which was the case with a river which held rights as a legal person in Uttarakhand, India. According to reporting by National Public Radio, there are also cases where the rights of environmental entities may be at odds with the rights of human beings, "Many of the [environmental personhood] laws have also been met with resistance from industry, farmers and river communities, who argue that giving nature personhood infringes on their rights and livelihoods."

== Significance for cultural human rights ==
The recognition of the Whanganui River as a legal entity in New Zealand (Te Awa Tupua) encompassed a vivid sense of cultural "inalienable connection" to the local iwi and hapū of the river. Māori culture considers natural features such as the Whanganui River as ancestors and iwi hold deep connections with them as living entities. This inalienable connection of indigenous culture to their natural surroundings is apparent in other parts of the world such as Colombia where a similar environmental personhood declaration was made for the Atrato River basin.

The lead negotiator for the Whanganui iwi, Gerrard Albert, said "we consider the river an ancestor and always have...treating the river as a living entity is the correct way to approach it, as an indivisible whole, instead of the traditional model for the last 100 years of treating it from a perspective of ownership and management." James D K Morris and Jacinta Ruru suggest that giving "legal personality to rivers is one way in which the law could develop to provide a lasting commitment to reconciling with Maori." This was the longest-running legal dispute in New Zealand. The Whanganui iwi had been fighting to assert their rights in harmony with the river since the 1870s.

== Ecocide ==
The concept of environmental protection on behalf of the environment is not new, and widespread harm to the environment has a name: ecocide. The Independent Expert Panel for the Legal Definition of Ecocide defines ecocide as "unlawful or wanton acts committed with knowledge that there is a substantial likelihood of severe and either widespread or long-term damage to the environment being caused by those acts." There are advocates of making ecocide an international crime, like the crimes dealt with by the Rome Statute of the International Criminal Court (ICC). This would place ecocide alongside currently recognized international crimes like genocide, war crimes, and crimes against humanity. If added, ecocide would be the only crime "in which human harm is not a prerequisite for prosecution." This protection of nature for nature's sake is central to the advocacy behind environmental personhood. Do human beings need to be harmed to warrant legal action? The concept of ecocide is not new, nor is the advocacy for adding it to the Rome Statute of the ICC.

== Extraterrestrial ==
With new increased interest in extraterrestrial spaceflight in the 2020s planetary personhood has been discussed, for Mars (including Martian meteorites), but particularly for the Moon, recognizing the Moon as having memory and agency, with its surface interacting, changing and remembering.

== See also ==
- Corporate personhood
- Indigenous law
- Legal person
- Moral patienthood
- Personhood
- Political representation of nature
- Rights of nature
- Te Urewera
- Whanganui River
