= Rights of nature =

Legal theory

Rights of nature or Earth rights is a legal and jurisprudential theory that describes inherent rights as associated with ecosystems and species, similar to the concept of fundamental human rights. The rights of nature concept challenges twentieth-century laws as generally grounded in a flawed frame of nature as "resource" to be owned, used, and degraded. Proponents argue that laws grounded in rights of nature direct humanity to act appropriately and in a way consistent with modern, system-based science, which demonstrates that humans and the natural world are fundamentally interconnected.

This school of thought is underpinned by two basic lines of reasoning. First, since the recognition of human rights is based in part on the philosophical belief that those rights emanate from humanity's own existence, logically, so too do inherent rights of the natural world arise from the natural world's own existence. A second and more pragmatic argument asserts that the survival of humans depends on healthy ecosystems, and so protection of nature's rights in turn, advances human rights and well-being.

From a rights of nature perspective, most environmental laws of the twentieth century are based on an outmoded framework that considers nature to be composed of separate and independent parts, rather than components of a larger whole. A more significant criticism is that those laws tend to be subordinate to economic interests, and aim at reacting to and just partially mitigating economics-driven degradation, rather than placing nature's right to thrive as the primary goal of those laws. This critique of existing environmental laws is an important component of tactics such as climate change litigation that seeks to force societal action to mitigate climate change.

As of May 2024, close to 500 rights of nature laws exist at the local to national levels in 40 countries, including dozens of cities and counties throughout the United States. They take the form of constitutional provisions, treaty agreements, statutes, local ordinances, and court decisions. A state constitutional provision is being sought in Florida.

== Basic tenets ==
Proponents of rights of nature argue that, just as human rights have been recognized increasingly in law, so should nature's rights be recognized and incorporated into human ethics and laws. This claim is underpinned by two lines of reasoning: that the same ethics that justify human rights, also justify nature's rights, and, that humans' own survival depend on healthy ecosystems.

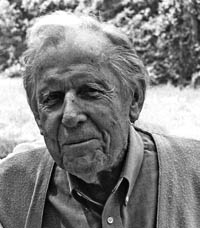
Thomas Berry – a U.S. cultural historian who introduced the legal concept of Earth Jurisprudence who proposed that society's laws should derive from the laws of nature, explaining that "the universe is a communion of subjects, not a collection of objects"

First, it is argued that if inherent human rights arise from human existence, so too logically do inherent rights of the natural world arise from the natural world's own existence. Human rights, and associated duties to protect those rights, have expanded over time. Most notably, the 1948 adoption by the United Nations, of the Universal Declaration of Human Rights (UDHR) that formalized recognition of broad categories of inalienable human rights. Drafters of the UDHR stated their belief that the concept of fundamental human rights arose not from "the decision of a worldly power, but rather in the fact of existing."

Some scholars have contended thereafter that, given that basic human rights emanate from humans' own existence, nature's rights similarly arise from the similar existence of nature, and so humans' legal systems should continue to expand to recognize the rights of nature.

Some notable proponents of this approach include U.S. cultural historian Thomas Berry, South African attorney Cormac Cullinan, Indian physicist and eco-social advocate Vandana Shiva, and Canadian law professor and U.N. Special Rapporteur for Human Rights and the Environment David R. Boyd.

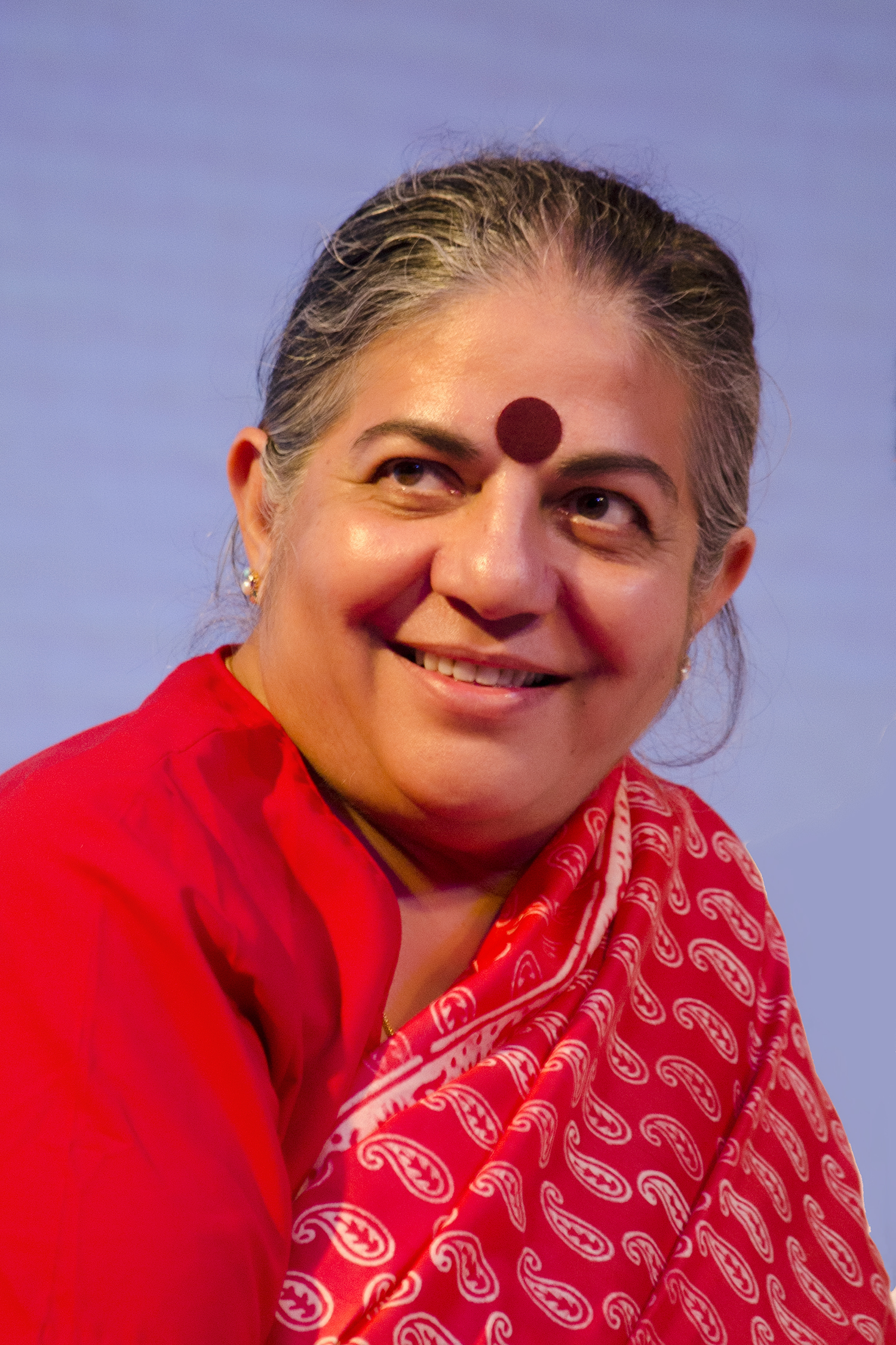
Vandana Shiva – an Indian scholar and activist who has written extensively on Earth Jurisprudence and Earth Democracy that she describes as based on "local communities – organized on principles of inclusion, diversity, and ecological and social responsibility"

Thomas Berry introduced a philosophy and ethics of law concept called Earth jurisprudence that identifies the earth's laws as primary and consequently reasons that everything has an intrinsic right to be and to evolve by the very fact of its existence. Earth Jurisprudence has been increasingly recognized and promoted worldwide by legal scholars, the United Nations, lawmakers, philosophers, ecological economists, and other experts as a foundation for Earth-centered governance, including laws and economic systems that protect the fundamental rights of nature.

Second, support for rights of nature also is supported through the utilitarian argument that humanity can only thrive in the long term by accepting integrated co-existence of humans with the natural world. Berry noted that the concept of human well-being derived from natural systems with no fundamental right to exist is inherently illogical, and that by protecting nature's rights, humans advance their own self-interest.

The legal and philosophical concept of rights of nature offers a shift from a frame of nature as property or resource, to nature as an interconnected Earth community partner. This school of thought aims at following the same path that human rights movements have followed, where at first recognition of rights in the rightless appeared "unthinkable", but later matured into a broadly-espoused worldview.

Christopher Stone, a law professor at the University of Southern California, wrote extensively on this topic in his seminal essay, "Should Trees Have Standing", cited by a U.S. Supreme Court dissent in Sierra Club v. Morton for the position that "environmental issues should be tendered by [nature] itself." (Note: The Sierra Club v. Morton case was decided by the Supreme Court of the United States in 1972. In it, Justice William O. Douglas wrote a dissenting opinion. His opinion highlighted the rights of nature and the intellectual contributions of Christopher Stone and Aldo Leopold: "(...)Contemporary public concern for protecting nature's ecological equilibrium should lead to the conferral of standing upon environmental objects to sue for their own preservation. See Stone, Should Trees Have Standing? -- Toward Legal Rights for Natural Objects, 45 S.Cal.L.Rev. 450 (1972).(...). Inanimate objects are sometimes parties in litigation. A ship has a legal personality, a fiction found useful for maritime purposes. The corporation sole -- a creature of ecclesiastical law -- is an acceptable adversary, and large fortunes ride on its cases. The ordinary corporation is a "person" for purposes of the adjudicatory processes, whether it represents proprietary, spiritual, aesthetic, or charitable causes. So it should be as respects valleys, alpine meadows, rivers, lakes, estuaries, beaches, ridges, groves of trees, swampland, or even air that feels the destructive pressures of modern technology and modern life. The river, for example, is the living symbol of all the life it sustains or nourishes -- fish, aquatic insects, water ouzels, otter, fisher, deer, elk, bear, and all other animals, including man, who are dependent on it or who enjoy it for its sight, its sound, or its life. The river as plaintiff speaks for the ecological unit of life that is part of it. Those people who have a meaningful relation to that body of water -- whether it be a fisherman, a canoeist, a zoologist, or a logger -- must be able to speak for the values which the river represents, and which are threatened with destruction.(...) Ecology reflects the land ethic; and Aldo Leopold wrote in A Sand County Almanac 204 (1949), "The land ethic simply enlarges the boundaries of the community to include soils, waters, plants, and animals, or collectively: the land." That, as I see it, is the issue of "standing" in the present case and controversy.") As described by Stone and others, human rights have increasingly been "found" over time and declared "self-evident", as in the U.S. Declaration of Independence, even where essentially non-existent in the law. The successes of past and current human rights movements provide lessons for the current movement to widen the circle of Earth community to include natural systems and species populations as rights-bearing entities.

== Underpinnings and development ==
=== Critique of anthropocentric legal systems ===
Proponents of a shift to a more environmentally protective system of law contend that current legal and economic systems fail because they consider nature fundamentally as property, which can be degraded for profit and human desire. They point out that the perspective of nature as primarily an economic resource already has degraded some ecosystems and species so significantly that now, prominent policy experts are examining "endangered species triage" strategies to decide which species will be let go, rather than re-examine the economics driving the degradation. While twentieth and twenty-first century environmental laws do afford some level of protection to ecosystems and species, it is argued that such protections fail to stop, let alone reverse, overall environmental decline, because nature is by definition subordinated to anthropogenic and economic interests, rather than biocentric well-being.

Rights of nature proponents contend that re-envisioning current environmental laws from a nature's rights frame demonstrates the limitations of current legal systems. For example, the U.S. Endangered Species Act prioritizes protection of existing economic interests by activating only when species populations are headed toward extinction. By contrast, a "Healthy Species Act" would prioritize achievement of thriving species populations and facilitate economic systems that drive conservation of species.

As another example, the European Union's Water Framework Directive of 2000, "widely accepted as the most substantial and ambitious piece of European environmental legislation to date", relies on a target of "good status" of all EU waters, which includes consideration of needed "ecological flows". However, decades after the Directive's adoption, despite scientific advances in identifying flow-ecology relationships, there remains no EU definition of "ecological flow", nor a common understanding of how it should be calculated. A nature's rights frame would recognize not only the existing human right to water for basic needs, but would also recognize the rights of waterways to adequate, timely, clean water flows, and would define such basic ecological flow needs accordingly.

=== Harmonious coexistence within Nature ===
Scholars and advocacy organizations have also referred to the idea of harmonious coexistence within Nature as a related philosophical and worldview framework. The concept emphasizes living in ways that strengthen ecological interdependence and respect the rights of all beings. It has been discussed in policy and academic literature as part of a broader ecocentric approach to environmental law and environmental ethics and been included in instruments of multilateral environmental agreements such as the Kunming-Montreal Global Biodiversity Framework.

=== Underlying science and ethics ===
Modern environmental laws began to arise in the 1960s out of a foundational perspective of the environment as best managed in discrete pieces. For example, United States laws such as the Clean Water Act, Clean Air Act, Endangered Species Act, Marine Mammal Protection Act, and numerous others began to be adopted in the early 1970s to address various elements of the natural world, separately from other elements. Some laws, such as the U.S. National Environmental Policy Act, called for a more holistic analysis of proposed infrastructure projects and required the disclosure of expected negative environmental impacts. However, it did not require that actions be taken to address those impacts in order to ensure ecosystem and species health.

These laws reflected the science of the time, which was grounded in a reductionist analysis of the natural world; the modern, system-based understanding of the natural world, and the integrated place of humans with it, was still in development. The first major textbook on ecological science that described the natural world as a system rather than a collection of different parts, was not written until 1983. The Gaia Hypothesis, which offered a scientific vision of the world as a self-regulating, complex system, first arose in the 1970s. Systems dynamics similarly began to evolve from a business focus to include socioeconomic and natural systems starting in the 1970s. Since then, scientific disciplines have been converging and advancing on the concept that humans live in a dynamic, relationship-based world that "den[ies] the possibility of isolation".

While science in the late twentieth century shifted to a systems-based perspective, describing natural systems and human populations as fundamentally interconnected on a shared planet, environmental laws generally did not evolve with this shift. Reductionist U.S. environmental laws passed in the early 1970s remained largely unchanged, and other national and international environmental law regimes similarly stopped short of embracing the modern science of systems.

Nineteenth century linguist and scholar Edward Payson Evans, an early rights of nature theorist and author of "the first extensive American statement of (...) environmental ethics", wrote that each human is "truly a part and product of Nature as any other animal, and [the] attempt to set him up on an isolated point outside of it is philosophically false and morally pernicious".

Thomas Berry proposed that society's laws should derive from the laws of nature, explaining that "the universe is a communion of subjects, not a collection of objects". From the scientific perspective that all life arose from the context of the universe, Berry offered the ethical perspective that it is flawed to view humans as the universe's only subjects, with all other beings merely a collection of objects to be owned and used. Rather, consideration of life as a web of relationships extending back to a shared ancestry confers subject status to all, including the inherent rights associated with that status. Laws based on a recognition of the intrinsic moral value of the natural world, create a new societal moral compass that directs society's interactions with the natural world more effectively toward well-being for all.

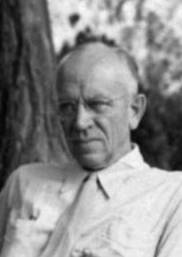
Aldo Leopold – a scientist and forester who advocated to "see land as a community to which we belong" rather than as "a commodity belonging to us" (1946 photograph)

Scientists who similarly wrote in support of expanded human moral development and ethical obligation include naturalist John Muir and scientist and forester Aldo Leopold. Leopold expressed that "[w]hen we see land as a community to which we belong", rather than "a commodity belonging to us", we can "begin to use it with love and respect". Leopold offered implementation guidance for his position, stating that a "thing is right when it tends to preserve the integrity, stability, and beauty of the biotic community. It is wrong when it tends otherwise." Berry similarly observed that "whatever preserves and enhances this meadow in the natural cycles of its transformation is good; what is opposed to this meadow or negates it is not good." Physician and philosopher Albert Schweizer defined right actions as those that recognize a reverence for life and the "will to live".

The outgrowth of scientific and ethical advances around natural systems and species is a proposed new frame for legal and governance systems, one grounded in an ethic and a language that guide behavior away from ecological and social practices that ignore or minimize human-nature interconnections. Court decisions including examples in Ecuador, Colombia and India have relied on these scientific developments in recognizing, interpreting and giving content to the legal rights of nature. Rather than a vision of merely "sustainable development", which reflects a frame of nature maintained as economic feedstock, scholars supporting rights of nature suggest that society is beginning to consider visions such as "thriving communities", where "communities" includes nature as a full subject, rather than simply an object to be used.

While some rights-of-nature laws grant rights to nature without any duties, others view nature as a legal person with rights as well duties and legal liability.

== History ==
=== Common roots with Indigenous worldviews ===
The ethical and philosophical foundation of a nature's rights legal theory and movement is a worldview of respect for nature, as contrasted with the "nature domination" worldview that underlies the concept of nature as object and property. Indigenous law professor John Borrows observed that "[w]ithin indigenous legal traditions, creation stories... give guidance about how to live with the world", rather than live at odds with it. A 2012 international Declaration of Indigenous Peoples found that modern laws destroy the earth because they do not respect the "natural order of Creation". The Declaration observed that humans "have our place and our responsibilities within Creation's sacred order" and benefit from "sustaining joy as things occur in harmony with the Earth and with all life that it creates and sustains".

Indigenous worldviews align with and have accelerated the development of rights of nature law, including in Ecuador and Bolivia. Ecuador amended its constitution in 2008 to recognize the rights of nature in light of the perceived need to better protect and respect Pachamama, a term that embodies both the physical and the spiritual aspects of the natural world. Bolivia similarly amended its constitution and enacted nature's rights statutes to reflect traditional Indigenous respect for Pachamama, and a worldview of natural systems and humans as part of one family.

New Zealand law professor Catherine Iorns Magallanes observed that traditional Indigenous worldviews embody a connection with nature is so deep that nature is regarded as a living ancestor. From this worldview arises responsibilities to protect nature as one would a family member, and the need for a legal structure that reflects a primary frame of responsibilities to the natural world as kin.

However, several scholars have denounced the Indigenous aspects of rights of nature to be a myth, and some have argued that one-sided implementations of rights of nature could be detrimental to indigenous communities.

=== Common roots with world religions ===
Many of the world's other religious and spiritual traditions offer insights consistent with a nature's rights worldview. Eastern religious and philosophical traditions embrace a holistic conception of spirituality that includes the Earth. Chinese Daoism and Neo-Confucianism, as well as Japanese Buddhism, teach that the world is a dynamic force field of energies known as bussho (Buddha nature or qi), the material force that flows through humans, nature, and universe. As the eleventh century pioneering Neo-Confucianist philosopher Zhang Zai explained, "that which extends throughout the universe I regard as my body and that which directs the universe I consider as my nature".

In both Hinduism and Buddhism, karma ("action" or "declaration" in Sanskrit) reflects the reality of humanity's networked interrelations with Earth and universe. Buddhist concepts of "co-dependent arising" similarly hold that all phenomena are intimately connected. Mahayana Buddhism's "Indra's Net" symbolizes a universe of infinitely repeated mutual relations, with no one thing dominating.

Western religious and philosophical traditions have recognized the context of Earth and universe in providing spiritual guidance as well. From the Neolithic through the Bronze ages, the societies of "Old Europe" revered numerous female deities as incarnations of Mother Earth. In early Greece, the earth goddess Gaia was worshipped as a supreme deity. In the Philebus and Timaeus, Plato asserted that the "world is indeed a living being endowed with a soul and intelligence (...) a single visible living entity containing all other living entities, which by their nature are all related". Medieval theologian St. Thomas Aquinas later wrote of the place of humans, not at the center of being, but as one part of an integrated whole with the universe as primary, stating that "The order of the universe is the ultimate and noblest perfection in things."

More recently, Pope Benedict XVI, head of the Catholic Church, reflected that, "[t]he obedience to the voice of Earth is more important for our future happiness... than the desires of the moment. Our Earth is talking to us and we must listen to it and decipher its message if we want to survive." His successor, Pope Francis, has been particularly vocal on humanity's relationship with the Earth, describing how humans must change their current actions in light of the fact that "a true 'right of the environment' does exist". He warned against humanity's current path, stating that "the deepest roots of our present failures" lie in the direction and meaning of economic growth, and the overarching rule of a "deified market".

The Qur'an, Islam's primary authority in all matters of individual and communal life, reflects that "the whole creation praises God by its very being". Scholars describe the "ultimate purpose of the Shari'ah" as "the universal common good, the welfare of the entire creation," and note that "not a single creature, present or future, may be excluded from consideration in deciding a course of action."

Bringing together Western and Indigenous traditions, Archbishop Desmond Tutu spoke of "Ubuntu", an African ethical concept that translates roughly to "I am because you are", observing that: "Ubuntu speaks particularly about the fact that you can't exist as a human being in isolation. It speaks about our interconnectedness... We think of ourselves far too frequently as just individuals, separated from one another, whereas you are connected and what you do affects the whole world."

=== Common roots with human rights ===
Human rights have been developing over centuries, with the most notable outgrowth being the adoption of Universal Declaration of Human Rights (UDHR) by the United Nations in 1948. Key to the development of those rights are the concepts of natural rights, and rights of humans emanating from the existence of humanity.

Roderick Fraser Nash, professor of history and environmental studies at the University of California, Santa Barbara, traced the history of rights for species and the natural world back to the thirteenth century Magna Carta's launch of the concept of "natural rights" that underlies modern rights discourse.

Peter Burdon, professor at the University of Adelaide Law School and an Earth Jurisprudence scholar, has expanded upon Nash's analysis, offering that seventeenth century English philosopher and physician John Locke's transformative natural rights thesis led to the American Revolution, through the concept that the British monarchy was denying colonists their natural rights. Building on that concept, U.S. President, attorney, and philosopher Thomas Jefferson argued that the "laws of nature and of nature's God" reveal "self-evident" truths that "all Men are created equal" in their possession of "certain unalienable rights", particularly "life, liberty, and the pursuit of happiness". The 1789 French Declaration of the Rights of Man and of the Citizen later recognized as well the "natural, inalienable and sacred rights of Man", adding that the "final end of every political institution is the preservation of the natural and imprescriptible rights of Man."

The expansion of rights continued out to animals, with eighteenth-nineteenth century English philosopher and legal theorist Jeremy Bentham claiming that the "day may come when the rest of the animal creation may acquire those rights which never could have been withholden from them but by the hand of tyranny". Nineteenth-century linguist and scholar Edward Payson Evans observed that:

[i]n tracing the history of the evolution of ethics we find the recognition of mutual rights and duties confined at first to members of the same horde or tribe, then extended to worshippers of the same gods, and gradually enlarged so as to include every civilized nation, until at length all races of men are at least theoretically conceived as being united in a common bond of brotherhood and benevolent sympathy, which is now slowly expanding so as to comprise not only the higher species of animals, but also every sensitive embodiment of organic life.

The 1948 adoption of the Universal Declaration of Human Rights (UDHR) by the United Nations was another milestone, underpinned by the belief that fundamental human rights arise from "the fact of existing". The movement for rights of nature built on this belief, arguing that if "existence" is the defining condition for fundamental rights, this defining condition could not be limited to the rights of only one form of existence, and that all forms of existence should enjoy fundamental rights. For example, Aldo Leopold's land ethic explicitly recognized nature's "right to continued existence" and sought to "change the role of Homo sapiens from conqueror of the land-community to plain member and citizen of it".

Proponents of the rights of nature also contend that from the abolition of slavery, to the granting of the right to vote to women, to the civil rights movement, and the recognition of other fundamental rights, societies have continued to expand rights in parallel with a growing acceptance of the inherent moral worth of the potential new rights holders. And, that this expansion of the circle of community ought to continue to grow to encompass the natural world, a position that has seen growing acceptance in the late twentieth century and early twenty-first.

Proponents suggest that rights derived from existence in nature do not confer human rights to all beings, but rather confer unique rights to different kinds of beings. Thomas Berry put forth the theory that rights "are species specific and limited"; that is, "rivers have river rights", "birds have bird rights", and "humans have human rights". In his view, the difference is "qualitative, not quantitative".

Extending this point, the common ethical and moral grounding of human rights and the rights of nature gives rise to the concept of "co-violations" of rights, defined as a "situation in which governments, industries, or others violate both the rights of nature and human rights, including indigenous rights, with the same action". For example, in the Ecuadorian Amazon, pollution from Texaco's (now Chevron) oil drilling operations from 1967 to 1992 resulted in an epidemic of birth defects, miscarriages, and an estimated 1,400 cancer deaths, that were particularly devastating to indigenous communities. These operations further caused more than one million acres of deforestation and polluted local waterways with 18 billion gallons of toxic wastewater and contaminants, severely damaging a formerly pristine rainforest of extraordinary biodiversity. Asserting that the same human actions that created such impacts violated the fundamental rights of both people and natural systems, it is argued that ethical and legal theories that recognize both sets of rights will better guide human behavior to recognize and respect humans' interconnected relationships with each other and the natural world.

As with the recognition of human rights, legal scholars find that recognition of the rights of nature alters the framework of human laws and practices. Harvard Law professor Laurence Tribe theorized further that "choosing to accord nature a fraternal rather than an exploited role... might well make us different persons from the manipulators and subjugators we are in danger of becoming".

=== 20th and 21st century developments ===
The adoption of the UDHR in 1948 formalized recognition of broad categories of inalienable human rights globally. These include recognition that "[a]ll human beings are born free and equal in dignity and rights", that "[e]veryone has the right to life, liberty and security of person", and that "[e]veryone has the right to an effective remedy by the competent national tribunals for acts violating the fundamental rights granted". Recognition of fundamental rights in "soft law" instruments such as the UDHR provided guidance to nations around the world, who have since developed constitutional provisions, statutes, court decisions, regulations, and other bodies of law based on the UDHR and the human rights it champions.

Decades later, USC law professor Christopher Stone called for recognition of the legal standing and associated rights of the natural world as well, consistent with the "successive extension of rights" throughout legal history. As was done in the UDHR, Stone outlined the necessary elements of nature's participation in human legal systems, describing such a legal system as necessarily including: recognition of injuries as subject to redress by public body, standing to institute legal actions (with guardians acting on behalf of the natural entity), redress calculated for natural entity's own damages, and relief running to the benefit of the injured natural entity.

In addition to Stone's legal work, other late twentieth and early twenty-first century drivers of the rights of nature movement include indigenous perspectives and the work of the indigenous rights movement; the writings of Arne Naess and the Deep Ecology movement; Thomas Berry's 2001 jurisprudential call for recognizing the laws of nature as the "primary text"; the publication of Cormac Cullinan's Wild Law book in 2003, followed by the creation of an eponymous legal association in the UK; growing concern about corporate power through the expansion of legal personhood for corporations; adoption by U.S. communities of local laws addressing rights of nature; the creation of the Global Alliance of the Rights of Nature in 2010 (GARN; a nonprofit advancing rights on nature worldwide); and mounting global concerns with species losses, ecosystem destruction, and the existential threat of climate change.

These and other factors supported the development of the 2010 Universal Declaration of the Rights of Mother Earth (UDRME). The UDRME was adopted by representatives of 130 nations at the World People's Conference on Climate Change and the Rights of Mother Earth, convened in Bolivia following the concerns of many regarding the disappointing results of the 2009 Copenhagen climate negotiations. Just as the U.N. recognized human rights as arising from existence, so did the UDRME find that the "inherent rights of Mother Earth are inalienable in that they arise from the same source as existence". Like the UDHR, the UDRME defends the rights-bearing entity (nature and her elements) from the excesses of governing authorities. These rights include, among others, the recognition that "Mother Earth and all beings of which she is composed have... the right to life and to exist" as well as the "right to integral health". The UDRME adds that "[e]ach being has the right to a place and to play its role in Mother Earth for her harmonious functioning".

Just as the rights protected by the UDHR are enforceable by the "right to an effective remedy by the competent national tribunals", so too does the UDRME specifically require humans and their institutions to "recognize and promote the full implementation and enforcement of the rights and obligations recognized in this Declaration". The UDRME addresses enforcement by requiring "damages caused by human violations of the inherent rights" to be "rectified", with those responsible "held accountable".[88] Moreover, it calls on states to "empower human beings and institutions to defend the rights of Mother Earth and of all beings".

Bolivian President Evo Morales urged then-U.N. Secretary-General Ban Ki-moon to make U.N. adoption of the UDRME a priority. While that recommendation remains to be addressed, since then the UDRME has served to inform other international and national efforts, such as a 2012 Resolution by the International Union for Conservation of Nature (IUCN) proposing a Universal Declaration of the Rights of Nature. The Incorporation of the Rights of Nature was adopted at the IUCN World Conservation Congress in Hawaii (2016).

As of 2021 rights of nature has been reflected in treaties, constitutions, court decisions, and statutory and administrative law at all levels of government. Craig Kauffman, political science professor at the University of Oregon, and scholar of nature's rights and global governance, contends that evolving rights of nature initiatives and networks represent an "important new global movement" arising from "an informal global governance system... being constructed by citizens disillusioned by the failure of governments to take stronger actions to address the dual crises of climate change and biodiversity loss".

As well in 2021, the Declaration of the Rights of the Moon was created by a group of "lawyers, space archaeologists and concerned citizens", drawing on precedents in the Rights of Nature movement and the concept of legal personality for non-human entities in space.

== Rights of nature law ==
The early 2000s saw a significant expansion of rights of nature law, in the form of constitutional provisions, treaty agreements, national and subnational statutes, local laws, and court decisions. As of 2022, nature's rights laws exist in 24 countries (up from 17 in 2021), including in Canada, at least seven Tribal Nations in the U.S. and Canada, and over 60 cities and counties throughout the United States. The total number of countries with either existing or pending rights of nature legal provisions was 29 as of 2022.

Legal interpretations and implementations of rights of nature vary across jurisdictions, particularly in relation to aquatic ecosystems. Comparative legal research indicates that countries have adopted diverse mechanisms — including court decisions, laws, and ordinances — to recognize rights of nature for freshwater and marine ecosystems, with distinctions in how such rights are conceptualized (e.g., legal personhood, subject of rights, or living entity) and in how representation and enforcement structures are organized. These studies also highlight persistent challenges, such as determining who grants the rights, on what legal basis they are recognized, and how they are implemented and enforced in practice.

== Related initiatives ==
The development of stronger and more active transnational rights of nature networks during the early 2000s, is a likely cause for the greater adoption of those championed principles into law. This has occurred in close integration with other, system-changing initiatives and movements for rights, including: development and implementation of new economic and finance models that seek to better reflect human rights and nature's rights; indigenous leadership to advance both the rights of indigenous peoples and nature's rights; international social movements such as the human right to water; advancement of practical solutions consistent with a nature's rights frame, such as rewilding; and rights of nature movement capacity building, including through development of nature's rights movement hubs globally.

To illustrate implementation of nature's rights laws, the nonprofit Global Alliance for the Rights of Nature established "International Rights of Nature Tribunals". These are civil society initiatives and they issue non-binding recommendations. The tribunals bring together advocates of rights of nature, human rights, and rights of indigenous peoples into a process similar to the Permanent Peoples' Tribunals. The goal of the tribunals is to provide formal public recognition, visibility, and voice to the people and natural systems injured by alleged violations of fundamental rights and marginalized in current law, and to offer a model for redress for such injuries.

As awareness of rights of nature law and jurisprudence has spread, a new field of academic research is developing, where legal scholars and other scholars have begun to offer strategies and analysis to drive broader application of such laws, particularly in the face of early implementation successes and challenges.

== In popular culture ==
The 2018 documentary Rights of Nature: A Global Movement, directed by Isaac Goeckeritz, Hal Crimmel and Valeria Berros explores the challenges of creating new legal structures in relation to Rights of Nature.

A documentary film entitled Invisible Hand about the rights of nature movement, directed by Joshua Boaz Pribanic and Melissa Troutman of Public Herald, was released in 2020, executive-produced and narrated by actor Mark Ruffalo. It won four Best Documentary Awards.

The Overstory, which won the 2019 Pulitzer Prize for Fiction and spent over a year on the New York Times bestseller list, examined relationships with and rights of trees.

The podcast Damages explores the concept of the rights of nature in different contexts.

The Daily Show covered the concept of the rights of nature in an episode.

== See also ==
- Animal rights
- Common heritage of humanity
- Earth Charter
- Earth jurisprudence
- Ecocide (attempts to criminalize human activities that cause extensive damage to ecosystems)
- Environmental personhood
- Florida Right To Clean Water proposed amendment to state constitution
- Indigenous law
- Moral patienthood
- Political representation of nature
- Sumak kawsay (Buen Vivir, or "good living", rooted in the worldview of the Quechua peoples of the Andes)
- Wild law (human laws that are consistent with Earth jurisprudence)
