= World People's Conference on Climate Change =

Global gathering of civil society and governments held in April 2010

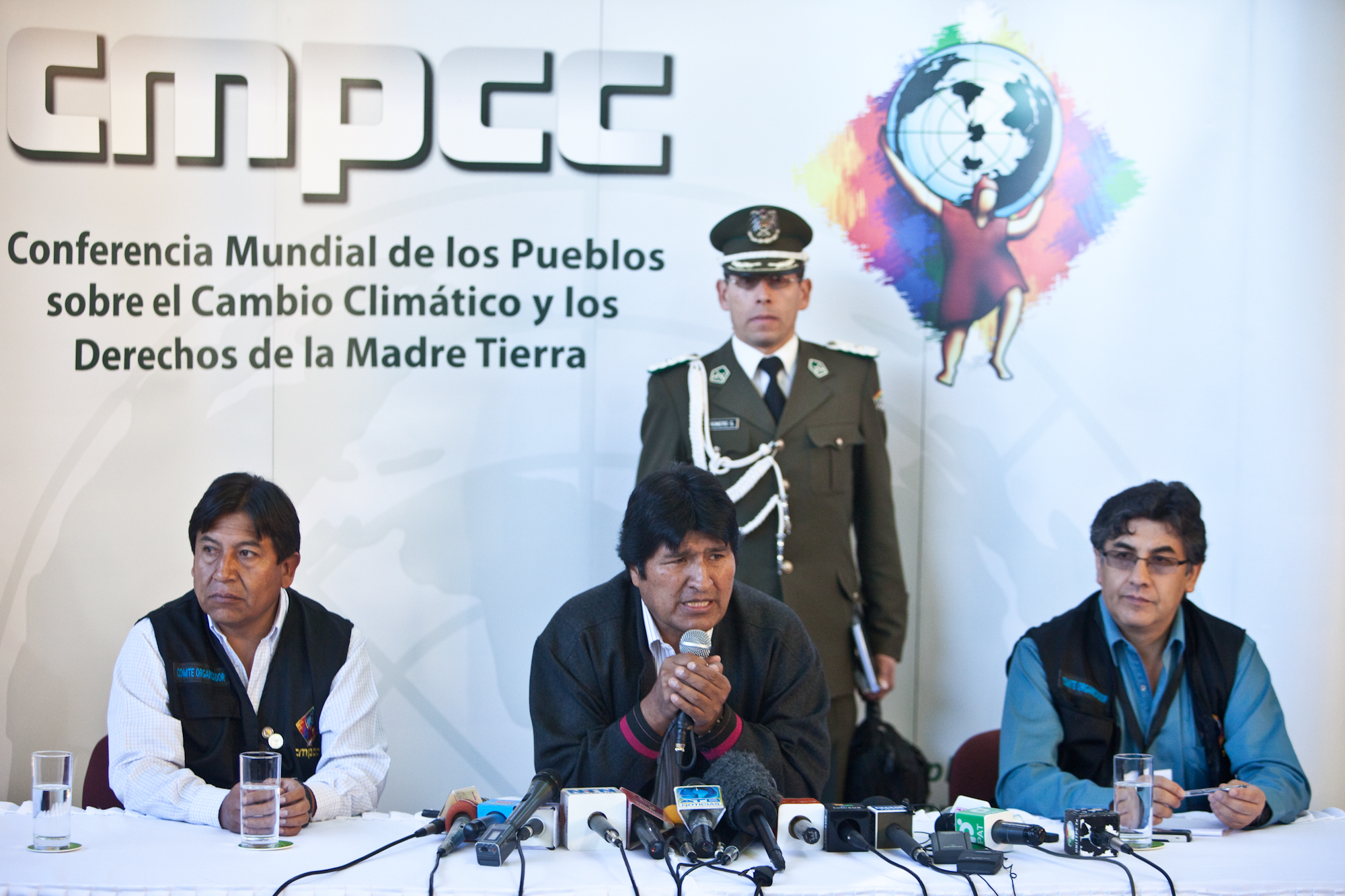
Evo Morales at a press conference during the event.

The World People's Conference on Climate Change and the Rights of Mother Earth was a global gathering of civil society and governments hosted by the government of Bolivia in Tiquipaya, just outside the city of Cochabamba on 19–22 April 2010.

== Description ==
The event was attended by around 30,000 people from over 100 countries, and the proceedings were transmitted live online by OneClimate and the Global Campaign for Climate Action (GCCA). The conference was viewed as a response to what some termed failed climate talks in Copenhagen during the 15th United Nations Conference of Parties (COP15) climate meetings in December 2009. There have been claims after the Conference ended that there were flaws in its organization and that the Venezuelan government funded it partially.

One of the important objectives of the conference was to produce proposals for new commitments to the Kyoto Protocol and projects in the lead-up to the next UN climate negotiations scheduled during the COP16 meeting in Cancun, Mexico in December 2010.

Conference topics included a Universal Declaration on the Rights of Mother Earth (see external links below), a World People's Referendum on Climate Change, and the establishment of a Climate Justice Tribunal.

The World People's Conference on Climate Change and the Rights of the Mother Earth resulted in a People's Accord.

== See also ==
- List of environmental topics
