= Rights of nature in Ecuador =

With the adoption of a new constitution in 2008 under president Rafael Correa, Ecuador became the first country in the world to enshrine a set of codified Rights of Nature and to inform a more clarified content to those rights. Articles 10 and Chapter 7, Articles 71–74 of the Ecuadorian Constitution recognize the inalienable rights of ecosystems to exist and flourish, give people the authority to petition on the behalf of nature, and requires the government to remedy violations of these rights.

Sumac kawsay, in Quechua, meaning "good living", rooted in the cosmovisión (or worldview) of the Quechua peoples of the Andes, describes a way of life that is community-centric, ecologically-balanced and culturally-sensitive. The concept is related to tradition of legal and political scholarship advocating legal standing for the natural environment. The rights approach is a break away from traditional environmental regulatory systems, which regard nature as property.

Ecuador's Rights of Nature embodies the indigenous sumak kawsay principles, giving Pachamama constitutional rights to protect and restore its environment.

== History and context ==
President Rafael Correa entered into office in January 2007 with the help of La Revolución Ciudadana (The Citizens' Revolution) promising a new anti-neoliberalist Ecuador. A country that would unify and harmonize the broken relationships between the state, the economy, society, and its vital resources. Being the eighth president in 10 years, Correa called for a Constitutional Assembly to create a new constitution for Ecuador.

Ecuador relies heavily on the income gained from exploiting its natural resources. The country's largest export, crude petroleum, represents 29% of Ecuador's GDP, coming in with a total value of $5.63 billion. This has caused the country to suffer from vast deforestation in the Amazon, contaminated water and widespread illness.

Ecuador is also home to at least eight tribes of indigenous peoples, most of which reside in the Amazon, that have suffered from the negative environmental consequences of the extraction of oil. After several years of worsening economic and environmental conditions, uprisings from various indigenous communities, who found themselves receiving less support from the state, while simultaneously their land was being increasingly encroached upon by oil companies, brought attention to their concerns. After historically being excluded from the political process, indigenous groups, especially concerned about the worsening environmental devastation of the extraction business and global climate change, started social movements aimed at creating a new approach to development that would protect the environment and harmonize its relationship with people. CONAIE (National Confederation of Indigenous Nationalities of Ecuador), the largest federation of indigenous movements focused on social justice began lobbying for a new constitution that incorporated recognition of the nation's indigenous groups, their language, culture, history, and land rights, and inherently their concepts of sumak kawsay and Pachamama (English: "Mother Nature").

The economy, based on the exportation of the country's raw materials, mainly oil, was also wreaking havoc on the nation's environment, an area with valuable biological and cultural diversity. The global economic crisis of 2008 revealed the vulnerabilities of an extractive economy, and led to a period of political turmoil in the country that made obvious the need for a new more inclusive government that embodied a post-oil, post-neoliberal development paradigm. In late 2006, the election of leftist Rafael Correa, who ran on an anti-neoliberal platform, showed the emergence of a new political era for Ecuador.

== Development ==
=== Sumak kawsay / Buen vivir ===
Buen vivir ("good living") emerged as a response to the traditional strategies for development and their negative environmental, social, or economic effects. Sumak kawsay, meaning a full life and signifies living in harmony with other people and nature. Buen Vivir has gained new popularity, spreading throughout parts of South America and evolving as a multicultural concept. The constitution outlines Buen Vivir as a set of rights, one of which is the rights of nature. In line with the assertion of these rights, Buen Vivir changes the relationship between nature and humans to a more bio-pluralistic view, eliminating the separation between nature and society.

In Andean communities in Latin America development is expressed through the notion of sumak kawsay, the Quechua word for "buen vivir", has been proposed as an alternative conception of development and has been incorporated into the constitutions of Ecuador. It connotes a harmonious collective development that conceives of the individual within the context of the social and cultural communities and his or her natural environment. Rooted in the indigenous belief system of the Quechua, the concept incorporates western critiques of dominant development models to offer an alternative paradigm based on harmony between human beings including the natural environment.

=== The idea ===
The rights of nature are not a new concept. Christopher Stone is widely credited with creating its first written work. In his famous book, "Should Trees Have Standing?", Stone presented the case for conferring legal personality and rights on the environment. As Stone explained, the natural object would “have a legally recognized worth and dignity in its own right, and not merely to serve as a means to benefit ‘us’”. He also pointed out that just like "streams and forests" do not have the power to speak for themselves, neither do corporations, or states, infants, municipalities and universities. "Lawyers speak for them, as they customarily do for the ordinary citizen with legal problems."

Environmental activist and President of the Constitutional Assembly, Alberto Acosta published Nature as a Subject of Rights that first brought attention to the idea to the public and the government. Acosta proclaimed the rights of nature as a concept of historical progressivism. He compares it to when women were not thought of as subjects until they in fact became subjects of rights - so nature does not seem palpable in having rights-status until the concept is brought up and realized. The subject of rights are altogether inconstruable unless the concept is put into perspective and does in fact become a subject that is arguable, agreeable, or simply just talk-able.

=== Drafting ===
President Rafael Correa included calling for a Constitutional Assembly in his 2006 campaign. On April 15, 2007, over 80% of Ecuadorians voted in favor of calling a new assembly, thanks in large part to the support of indigenous communities. Indigenous groups had been pressuring for a new, more inclusive constitution for years, and were therefore actively involved in the drafting process. Alberto Acosta, the elected Assembly President, pledged to make the assembly more inclusive and incorporate the concerns of the indigenous into the constitution. In the end, a few indigenous representatives were elected to the assembly. To create a constitution based on the principles of Buen Vivir, the Constitutional Assembly, with the advice of the Pachamama Alliance, enlisted the help of the Community Environmental Legal Defense Fund (CELDF) to draft language for the new provisions of the constitution detailing the Rights of Nature. Specifically the US lawyers Mari Margil (associate director) and Thomas Linzey (executive director) were asked to use their experience to help the Ecuadorean environmental groups draft the amendments. Indigenous groups also played a role in the drafting process. Fundación Pachamama, in conjunction with leaders in CONAIE, met with members of the assembly to present their ideas for the constitution and gain support. A national media campaign detailing the tenets of the new constitution and the Rights of Nature was also launched to inform and gain support from the public.

Multiple roundtables were held in order to discuss the feasibility of adding the Rights of Nature to the constitution. An important argument would be that of consent vs consultation. The indigenous communities and some members of the Constitutional Assembly advocated for a right to consent, meaning they wanted a clear right to oppose or approve development projects, whereas the government opposed with promoting only consultation. In conclusion, the government stance prevailed and Article 408 confirms that all natural resources are the state's property. The state can decide to exploit any natural resources that it recognizes to be of national importance, solely as long as it consults the affected communities, without having any obligation to an agreement.

Assembly members Guillem Humberto and Ortiz Alfredo contended for the creation of an Ombudsman for Pachamama. This would replace the Minister of Environment, who was seen as inadequate, and would act as a legal guardian of nature's rights. In the end, Nature's Ombudsman was not added into the new constitution.

In the end there were many reasons for wanting the Rights of Nature. As previously mentioned, indigenous groups, specifically the four members of the Pachakutik within the Constitutional Assembly, advocated for judiciary rights of their communities' way of living. A less sincere take would be that illustrated by Rafael Esteves, a member of the populist right. He said that it was greatly known that they would be the first to give nature its legal rights within their constitution, the mere fact of this is what drove some members into agreement with its passing.

=== Adoption ===
On April 10, 2008, with 91 votes out of 130, the Constitutional Assembly approved Article 10 for inclusion in the new constitution. On June 7, the language of Articles 71 through 74, compiling the Rights of Nature, were presented and debated on, before receiving approval for inclusion in the constitution.

On September 28, 2008, a mandatory referendum was held to vote on the new constitution, where the adoption of the constitution was approved by 65% of voters.

== Articles of the Rights of Nature ==
The following articles are found under Title II: Rights in the Constitution of the Republic of Ecuador published in the Official Register on October 20, 2008.

=== Chapter One: Principles for the Enforcement of Rights ===
Article 10. Persons, communities, peoples, nations and communities are bearers of rights and shall enjoy the rights guaranteed to them in the Constitution and in international instruments. Nature shall be the subject of those rights that the Constitution recognizes for it.

=== Chapter Seven: Rights of Nature ===
Article 71. Nature, or Pacha Mama, where life is reproduced and occurs, has the right to integral respect for its existence and for the maintenance and regeneration of its life cycles, structure, functions and evolutionary processes. All persons, communities, peoples and nations can call upon public authorities to enforce the rights of nature. To enforce and interpret these rights, the principles set forth in the Constitution shall be observed, as appropriate. The State shall give incentives to natural persons and legal entities and to communities to protect nature and to promote respect for all the elements comprising an ecosystem.

Article 72. Nature has the right to be restored. This restoration shall be apart from the obligation of the State and natural persons or legal entities to compensate individuals and communities that depend on affected natural systems. In those cases of severe or permanent environmental impact, including those caused by the exploitation of nonrenewable natural resources, the State shall establish the most effective mechanisms to achieve the restoration and shall adopt adequate measures to eliminate or mitigate harmful environmental consequences.

Article 73. The State shall apply preventive and restrictive measures on activities that might lead to the extinction of species, the destruction of ecosystems and the permanent alteration of natural cycles. The introduction of organisms and organic and inorganic material that might definitively alter the nation's genetic assets is forbidden.

Article 74. Persons, communities, peoples, and nations shall have the right to benefit from the environment and the natural wealth enabling them to enjoy the good way of living. Environmental services shall not be subject to appropriation; their production, delivery, use and development shall be regulated by the State.

== Philosophy ==
Ecuador's codification of the Rights of Nature is significant as it is the first case where this concept has been evoked at the national level. The articles set out a rights-based system that recognizes Nature, or Pachamama, as a right-bearing entity that holds value in itself, apart from human use. This differs from traditional systems that see nature as property, giving landowners the right to damage or destroy ecosystems that depend on their land. The rights-based approach spelled out in the Rights of Nature expands on previous laws for regulation and conservation by recognizing that nature has fundamental and inalienable rights as a valuable entity in and of itself. The system also assigns liability for damage to the environment and holds the government responsible for the reparation of any damage. Additionally, if an ecosystem's rights are violated, it gives people the authority to petition on behalf of the ecosystem to ensure that its interests are not subverted to the interests of individuals or corporations.

The inclusion of the Rights of Nature also makes the constitution more democratic and inclusive, as it reflects the indigenes' idea of Nature as a mother that must be respected and celebrated. This is the first constitution that has incorporated indigenous concepts of sumak kawsay and Pachamama, as well as recognized the plurinationality of Ecuador. This has broad significance for the recognition of indigenous groups and their right to preserve their land and culture. The combination of human rights with the rights of nature will allow for more effective protection of indigenous communities.

The Rights of Nature are further incorporated in the updated National Plan for Good Living, which states guaranteeing the Rights of Nature and promoting a healthy and sustainable environment as one of its twelve objectives. Policies under the objective include aims to preserve and manage biodiversity, diversify the national energy matrix with renewable sources, prevent, control and mitigate environmental damage, promote adaptation to and mitigation of climate change, and incorporate environmental approach in all public policies.

=== From anthropocentric to ecocentric ===
The environmental laws that exist in the Anthropocene are geared toward the advantage of the human race. The rules to protect the environment are set for the health and wellness of humanity. Nature is seen as a property to humans.

The Anthropocene is catered to humans of privilege. Throughout history, it is evident that the government and powerful people have specified an otherness. "Like women, homosexuals and non-whites, nature is 'othered' by people through privileging law and rights that distinguish between subject and object."

Ecuador has taken action towards an ecocentric influenced constitution, giving nature legal, constitutional rights. This means that Ecuador has recognized nature, or Pachamama, as a capable and deserving right-bearing entity that is equal to humans. The Rights of Nature also transforms the relationship between nature and humans by asserting that nature is not just an object. By putting ecosystems on an equal footing with humans, the conception of humans as masters or as separate from nature is dismissed. Instead, this system celebrates nature and recognizes that humans are a part of it. Many have thought this to be part of progressivism and related it to other examples of progression such as homosexual rights and the rights of women.

== Outcomes and implementation ==
=== Legal effects ===
The Rights of Nature has been applied to several legal disputes and considered in government development initiatives.

==== Wheeler c. Director de la Procuraduria General Del Estado de Loja ====
Wheeler c. Director de la Procuraduria General Del Estado de Loja was the first case in history to vindicate the Rights of Nature. The lawsuit was filed against the local government near Rio Vilcabamba in March 2011, who were responsible for a road expansion project that dumped debris into the river, narrowing its width and thereby doubling its speed. The project was also done without the completion of an environmental impact assessment or consent of the local residents. The case was filed by two such residents, citing the violation of the Rights of Nature, rather than property rights, for the damage done to the river. The case was important because the court stated that the rights of nature would prevail over other constitutional rights if they were in conflict with each other, setting an important precedent. The proceedings also confirmed that the burden of proof to show there is no damage lies with the defendant. Though the plaintiffs were granted a victory in court, the enforcement of the ruling has been lacking, as the local government has been slow to comply with the mandated reparations.

==== República del Ecuador Asamblea Nacional, Comisión de la Biodiversidad y Recursos Naturales ====
In March 2011, right after the ruling on the Wheeler case, the government of Ecuador filed a case against illegal gold mining operations in northern Ecuador, in the remote districts San Lorenzo and Eloy Alfaro. The rights of nature were violated by the mining operations, which were argued to be polluting the nearby rivers. This case is different from the previous in that it was the government addressing the violation of the rights of nature. It was also swiftly enforced, as military operation to destroy the machinery used for illegal mining was ordered and implemented.

==== Yasuni ITT initiative ====
The Yasuni-Ishpingo, Tambococha, and Tiputini (ITT) Initiative, referring to the corridor of oil reserves within the Yasuni National Park, is the first post-oil development initiative that recognizes that the benefits gained from the Amazon are greater than the economic benefits from oil extraction. The aim of the initiative is therefore to protect the biodiversity of the area, which UNESCO has declared a biodiversity reserve, by keeping the oil reserves in the ground, in return for compensation from the international community for at least half of the projected benefit Ecuador would receive from the oil extraction (approximately $3.5 billion). These funds would be used to fund other economic initiatives to alleviate poverty and develop the renewable energy sector. The importance of keeping the oil in the ITT area in the ground has been argued as of international importance to mitigate the effects of global climate change by preventing CO_{2} emissions and the local environmental devastation the extraction would cause. The Rights of Nature and other articles of the new constitution also make the protection of the park a legal imperative, as the extraction would be a violation of nature's rights. Though there originally was some difficulty evoking a sense of international responsibility to fund the initiative, especially with the national constitution requiring this law already, eventually in August 2010 Ecuador came to an arrangement with the United Nations Development Programme (UNDP) for funding of the initiative through the issue of Yasuní Guarantee Certificates, denoting the amount of CO_{2} emissions avoided and their monetary value, which can potentially be used in the European Union Emission Trading Scheme.

==== Los Cedros ====
In 2021, in a landmark ruling, the constitutional court of Ecuador decided that mining permits for plans to mine for copper and gold in the protected cloud forest in Los Cedros, would harm the biodiversity and violate the rights of nature, and would be unconstitutional.

== Reactions ==
=== Praise ===
The adoption of the Rights of Nature by Ecuador has received praise internationally by many countries who see this as a revolutionary way to conceptualize the environment and a way for Ecuador to move beyond the extractive economy of its past. Initiatives to adopt the concept of ecosystem rights have been taken or are being taken in various parts of the world, including Bolivia, Turkey, Nepal, and various municipalities in the United States. In 2010, Bolivia adopted the Law of the Rights of Mother Earth to recognize rights of nature at the national level. The Colombian Constitutional and Supreme Courts recognized rights for the Atrato river and Amazon ecosystem in 2016 and 2018, respectively.

=== Criticisms ===
Criticisms of the Rights of Nature have generally centered on the mechanisms of enforcement of the provision. One criticism is that though the constitution establishes stronger regulations for the environment, it also gives the state the power to relax these regulations if found to be in the national interest. Therefore, much of the enforcement of the ecosystem's rights depends on the will of the government, or an active citizenry. Indigenous groups have also expressed dissatisfaction that the constitution does not give local communities veto power over projects affecting their land. The amendments only call for consultation of the projects, rather than consent by the surrounding communities, which can undermine their ability to uphold the rights of nature. There are also concerns that the Rights of Nature could negatively affect foreign direct investment since companies will not want to comply with the more stringent regulations. On the other hand, people are skeptical of the Correa administration for still approving projects by foreign extraction companies violating the Rights of Nature. This skepticism comes from the history of corruption within the Ecuadorean government, and Correa's actions in shutting down any environmental groups that stand for the Rights of Nature such as the Accion Ecologica (AE) as well as the Development Council of the Indigenous Nationalities and Peoples of Ecuador (CODENPE).

There is much criticism on the text itself of the Rights of Nature, specifically on their content and structure. Some argue the controversy or clashing of articles and the lack of hierarchy between them. There is no clear understanding whether human's constitutional rights or nature's constitutional rights has more power. Another thing would be the vagueness of the text that leaves a lot of important factors without specific definition. Ecuador does not define "la naturaleza" or "Pachamama," making the extents of the groups involved unclear. It also leaves to question who is given judicial standing to represent nature, and who is going to enforce those rights. Along those same lines, the extent of protection or remediation is unspecified.

== Sources ==
This article incorporates text from a free content work. Licensed under CC-BY-SA IGO 3.0. Text taken from Rethinking Education. Towards a Global Common Good?, p32, UNESCO.
