= Greenhouse Development Rights =

Greenhouse Development Rights (GDRs) is a justice-based effort-sharing framework designed to show how the costs of rapid climate stabilization can be shared fairly, among all countries. More precisely, GDRs seeks to transparently calculate national “fair shares” in the costs of an emergency global climate mobilization, in a manner that takes explicit account of the fact that, as things now stand, global political and economic life is divided along both North/South and rich/poor lines.

Critically, GDRs approaches climate protection and economic development as two sides of one coin. Its goal is developmental justice, as it might exist even in a world that is compelled to rapidly reduce greenhouse-gas emissions to near-zero levels. The GDRs analysis suggests that rapid climate stabilization will prove impossible without an extremely strong commitment – a right – to a dignified level of sustainable human development (humanity). A right to life free from the privations of poverty.

The GDRs approach builds, whenever possible, upon established scientific and political understandings. In particular, it explicitly codifies the foundational call of the United Nations Framework Convention on Climate Change, which seeks “the widest possible cooperation by all countries and their participation in an effective and appropriate international response, in accordance with their common but differentiated responsibilities and respective capabilities.” The GDRs strategy is to transparently calculate responsibility and capacity for all countries, with respect to explicit assumptions and benchmarks that can be clearly debated, negotiated, and, when necessary, changed. By so doing, it seeks to provide a coherent, transparent, and compelling way of calculating and comparing national “fair shares” – broadly defined – of the cost of the global climate transition.

The goal of the GDRs effort is a sustainable mobilization that can be accepted as fair around the world. National obligations are calculated as shares of a global obligation that includes adaptation as well as mitigation. The approach here does not traditionally exhibit political realism, for that term is generally understood to imply an approach that starts with what is politically realistic today. The GDRs approach, in contrast, seeks to outline an approach that is consistent with the requirements of the climate science.

In the GDRs framework, a country's obligation to act is based upon its climate debt – its responsibility for contributing to climate change – and equally upon its capacity to act. Responsibility and capacity are both defined with respect to a “development threshold” that exempts the responsibilities and resources of the poor – survival resources and survival income – from being considered when calculating national obligation. Thus, GDRs can be seen as a reference framework intended to support clear, useful thinking about “comparability of effort,” even between widely disparate developed and developing nations.

Finally, GDRs is not an academic exercise. Climate stabilization is a global commons problem, one that is fundamentally defined by the problem of fair use. GDRs, by transparently calculating principle-based obligations to protect the global climate system, sets out a framework by which fair-shares emissions rights can be defined, calculated, understood, debated, and negotiated. As such, it lays out a framework by which actually existing climate treaties and strategies – even “bottom up pledges” like those welcomed by the Copenhagen Accord – can be transparently evaluated and compared.

== History ==
The Greenhouse Development Rights framework was developed and modeled by Paul Baer, Tom Athanasiou of EcoEquity, Sivan Kartha and Eric Kemp-Benedict of the Stockholm Environment Institute. GDRs evolved from per-capita frameworks that conceive of fair-shares global effort-sharing in terms of equal rights to emit greenhouse gases. The most well known of these is the proposal of Anil Agarwal and Sunita Narain (1991). The GDRs authors group felt that the per-capita emission rights approach lacked a systematic treatment of “national circumstances,” and attempted to solve this problem with a “Per-capita Plus” approach. They eventually concluded that, despite the obvious importance of the per-capita principle, it is not a viable foundation for a robust approach to a fair climate regime, not, at least, in a world where most all the “atmospheric space” has already been consumed. The Per-capita Plus approach was eventually abandoned in favor of GDRs (which is based not on per-capita rights but rather the UNFCCC principles of responsibility and capacity). GDRs debuted at a side event at the Tenth Conference of Parties (COP10) in Argentina in December 2004, with a paper and presentation entitled Cutting the Gordian Knot. The final, reworked version of this paper was published on April 15, 2005, under the title Cutting the Knot: Climate Protection, Political Realism, and Equity as Requirements of a Post-Kyoto Regime. The first edition of the GDRs book and model were published in 2007 by the Heinrich Böll Foundation, and was presented at COP-13 in Bali. The GDRs second edition book and model were released at COP 14 in Poznan. The GDRs framework continues to evolve. It can best be tracked at the project website.

== Development threshold ==
As a first step, GDRs codifies the right to development as a development threshold − a level of welfare below which people are not expected to share the costs of the climate transition. This threshold is not an extreme poverty line, which is typically defined to be so low ($1 or $2 a day) as to be more properly called a “destitution line.” Rather, it is set to be above the global poverty line (about $16 per person per day, in Purchasing Power Parity terms ), and to reflect a level of welfare that is beyond basic needs, but still well short of today's levels of affluent consumption. The level where a development threshold would best be set is a matter for debate. In the GDRs standard case, it is set to be modestly (25%) above the global poverty line, at about $20 per person per day ($7,500 per year). This figure reflects an empirical analysis of the income levels at which the classic plagues of poverty – malnutrition, high infant mortality, low educational attainment, high relative food expenditures – begin to disappear, or at least become exceptions to the rule. It also reflects the level at which the southern “middle class” begins to emerge.

Hardship, of course, persists at incomes above $7,500 per year, and a higher development threshold (and thus a more progressive effort-sharing function) can be strongly defended. But, for introductory purposes, the GDRs standard case takes people whose incomes are above $20 per day – be they lower middle-class or middle-class or wealthy – to have “developed,” in the most basic meaningful sense of the term. Poorer people, as they struggle for better lives, are taken to have little responsibility for the climate problem (the approximately 70 percent of humanity that lives below the development threshold is responsible for only about 15 percent of all cumulative emissions) and precious little capacity to invest in solving it. Richer people are taken as having realized their right to development and as bearing the responsibility to preserve that right for others. As their incomes rise, they assume a greater faction of the costs of curbing the emissions associated with their own consumption, as well as the costs of ensuring that, as those who still live below the threshold rise toward and then above it, they are able to do so along sustainable, low-emission paths. Moreover, and critically, these obligations are taken to belong to all those above the development threshold, whether they happen to live in the North or in the South.

== Responsibility and capacity ==
Based on the global development threshold, and national emissions history and income distribution data, it is possible to calculate any country's responsibility and capacity.

- A nation's responsibility is defined as the contribution it has made to climate change, and is specified in the GDRs standard case as its cumulative emissions since 1990. Emissions corresponding to consumption below the development threshold are excluded from the calculation. The 1990 baseline year is not fixed by the GDRs framework. Earlier dates are also plausible, and in practice the “responsibility state date” would be fixed by negotiation.
- A nation's capacity is defined as the national income not demanded by the necessities of everyday life. Thus, any income above the development threshold is available to be “taxed” for investment in climate mitigation and adaptation. This can be more straightforwardly interpreted as total income, excluding income below the development threshold.

These measures of responsibility and capacity can be combined (by averaging, in the GDRs standard case) to determine a country's obligation for shouldering the climate challenge, which is represented as a Responsibility and Capacity Index (RCI). This calculation is done for all countries. The precise numerical results depend, of course, on the particular values chosen for key parameters, such as the development threshold and the responsibility start date.

In the 2010 standard case, the United States, with its exceptionally large population of individuals with incomes above the $7,500 development threshold (capacity) and the world's largest share of cumulative emissions since 1990 (responsibility), has the largest single share (32 percent) of global RCI. The EU follows with 25 percent of the global RCI. China, despite being relatively poor, is home to a significant number of people still living above the development threshold, and has a notable 6.6 percent share of global RCI, which puts it close behind Japan with its 7.4 percent. India is also large but far poorer, placing it far behind with a 0.8 percent share.

== Emission reduction pathways ==
GDRs is a reference framework. Its principal goal is to demonstrate the fair allocation of the effort (or "burden”) of managing the global climate transition among nations. In mitigation terms, the size of this effort can be expressed as an increasingly wide wedge (measured in tons) that defines a “mitigation gap” between a business-as-usual emissions trajectory and an “emergency pathway” that is defined in scientific terms (see the 2 °C Emergency Pathway shown in Figure 2).

National reduction obligations in any year are defined as shares of the global mitigation gap, which is allocated among countries in proportion to their RCI. The US, for example (see Figure 2) is projected to have a 2020 reduction obligation equal to 29.1% of the roughly 4 Gigatonnes of carbon mitigation that will then be needed. In general, each country is given an emission target equal to its reference trajectory minus its proportional share of the global mitigation gap. Distributing the global mitigation gap in this way yields some striking results. For one thing, it clearly shows that a major commitment to North-South cooperation – including financial and technological transfers – is an inevitable part of any viable global climate stabilization architecture. This is because the national mitigation obligations of the high-RCI countries of the North vastly exceed the reductions they could conceivably make at home. In fact, by 2030, northern mitigation obligations typically come to exceed even their total domestic emissions. Which is to say that wealthier and higher emitting countries would receive “negative allocations,” as is necessary in order to open enough atmospheric space for the developing world. This kind of negative allocation can never arise under frameworks that seek to allocate “emission rights.”

== Institutional implications ==
Institutionally, there are many ways that a system like GDRs could be implemented. For example, an international fund could be used to support both mitigation and adaptation. In this case, the RCI would serve as the basis for determining each nation's expected financial contribution to that fund. More generally, it's useful to think about the RCI as, in effect, the basis of a progressive global “climate tax” – not a carbon tax, per se (carbon taxes are, all else being equal, regressive) but a responsibility and capacity tax. Alternatively, GDRs could be implemented by way of global emissions markets. In this case, national RCIs would be used to calculate allocations, in tons, and these would then be traded to generate the international financial flows necessary to support a fair global climate regime.

The scale and nature of the financial and technological cooperation demanded by the climate crisis is unprecedented, and will involve the expansion and reform of existing institutions, as well as the creation of entirely new ones. Any number of devices might be useful: progressive taxes of various kinds, trade-related levies, auctions, rebates, sectoral agreements, multilateral funds, international property-rights concessions, and so on. Beyond these, new and as-yet unnamed channels for both international resource transfer and accounting will need to be conceived and implemented, posing a set of challenges: How to scale up rapidly? How to build absorptive and distributional capacity? How to ensure efficiency and avoid waste? How to institute credible and democratic governance?

== Toward principle-based effort-sharing ==
Whatever the eventual utility of frameworks like GDRs, no principle-based effort-sharing system that would impose binding commitments on developing countries is likely to be adopted anytime soon. As long as developing countries are still lack convincing evidence that poverty eradication and human development can be attained simultaneously with decarbonization, binding commitments will appear to them as being too great a risk.

A transition to principle-based effort-sharing would require industrialized countries to embrace their commitment under the UNFCCC to “take the lead in combating climate change and the adverse effects thereof”, and in so doing convincingly demonstrate the existence of an alternative develop path. A trust-building and momentum-building period (lasting, say, to 2020) during which the industrialized countries prove the technical and political possibility of climate-friendly development would open up the possibility of a global regime based on principle-based effort-sharing.

== Other approaches to principle-based effort sharing ==
While the GDRs approach promotes a responsibility and capacity based effort-sharing regime, there are other approaches that aim to define fairness differently using different means.

- Simple per-capita takes national per-capita levels of greenhouse-gas emissions as its key equity indicator. The difference between GDRs and a simple per-capita approach is that the latter does not account for historical emissions or its strong correlation to national development. In general, countries with larger cumulative emissions are wealthier countries with more developed infrastructures, and the per-capita approaches can therefore impede developmental justice.
- Cumulative per-capita approaches define climate justice as the convergence of, not individual per-capita emissions, but rather per-capita emissions over time. Over, perhaps, a very long time. Such approaches are considered to be quite reasonable by many developing-country analysts. Chinese analysts, in particular, seem to see them as direct responses to per-capita proposals. Such an approach is reflected in the interest and recent popularity of the carbon debt approach to global climate justice. The aims of both the carbon debt campaign and the GDRs project are closely aligned. The two approaches embody altogether similar theories of equity and burden sharing, with differences that are minor, and even helpful, when it comes to fruitful debate and public education.

== See also ==
- Global warming
- Global climate regime
