= Rettet den Regenwald =

Rainforest Rescue (German: Rettet den Regenwald)
- Formation: 1986 Hamburg, Germany
- Type: Non-governmental organization
- Purpose: Conservation of rainforests and protection of the local inhabitants
- Headquarters: Hamburg, Germany
- Region served: Worldwide
- Members: approx. 13.000
- Executive Directors: Dr. Bettina Behrend and Marianne Klute
- Website: www.rainforest-rescue.org

Rainforest Rescue (German: Rettet den Regenwald) is a non-governmental environmental organization with head office in Germany which advocates the preservation of rainforests at global level. It is a politically independent organization that defends the inhabitants of the tropical rainforests and their living spaces. The work of the organization consists in launching petitions on its website (in German, English, French, Spanish and Portuguese language) and collecting donations for concrete projects in the affected tropical areas. The protest actions mainly deal with ecologic and social problems caused by the trade of tropical timber, gold mining, the expansion of industrial-scale monocultures and land conflicts with indigenous populations.

The organization does not receive any subsidies from the state or local governments and its activities are exclusively financed through donations. Today around 3,500 sustaining members are supporting the organization's work by annual donations, apart from thousands of sporadic donations every year. Rainforest Rescue was founded in 1986. As it was recognized by the Revenue of Hamburg as an organization of public interest, the donations can be deducted from income tax. In November 2002 the journal Öko-Test investigated its handling of donations and awarded Rainforest Rescue with the grade “very good“.

== History ==
Rettet den Regenwald (Rainforest Rescue) was founded in 1986 by Reinhard Behrend, who was the head of the organization until shortly before his death on June 5, 2020. The international support is seen as an essential means to defend the local inhabitants of the rainforests who, being deprived of their power, are dependent on this help in order to survive. The organization seeks to break what it considers a circle of lumber dealers, land owners, oil and mining companies and corrupt politicians who benefit, in the short term, from the destruction of rainforests, at the expense of nomads, indigenous groups, rubber tree tappers, riverbank populations and of peasants that are linked to the NGO.

== Cooperations ==
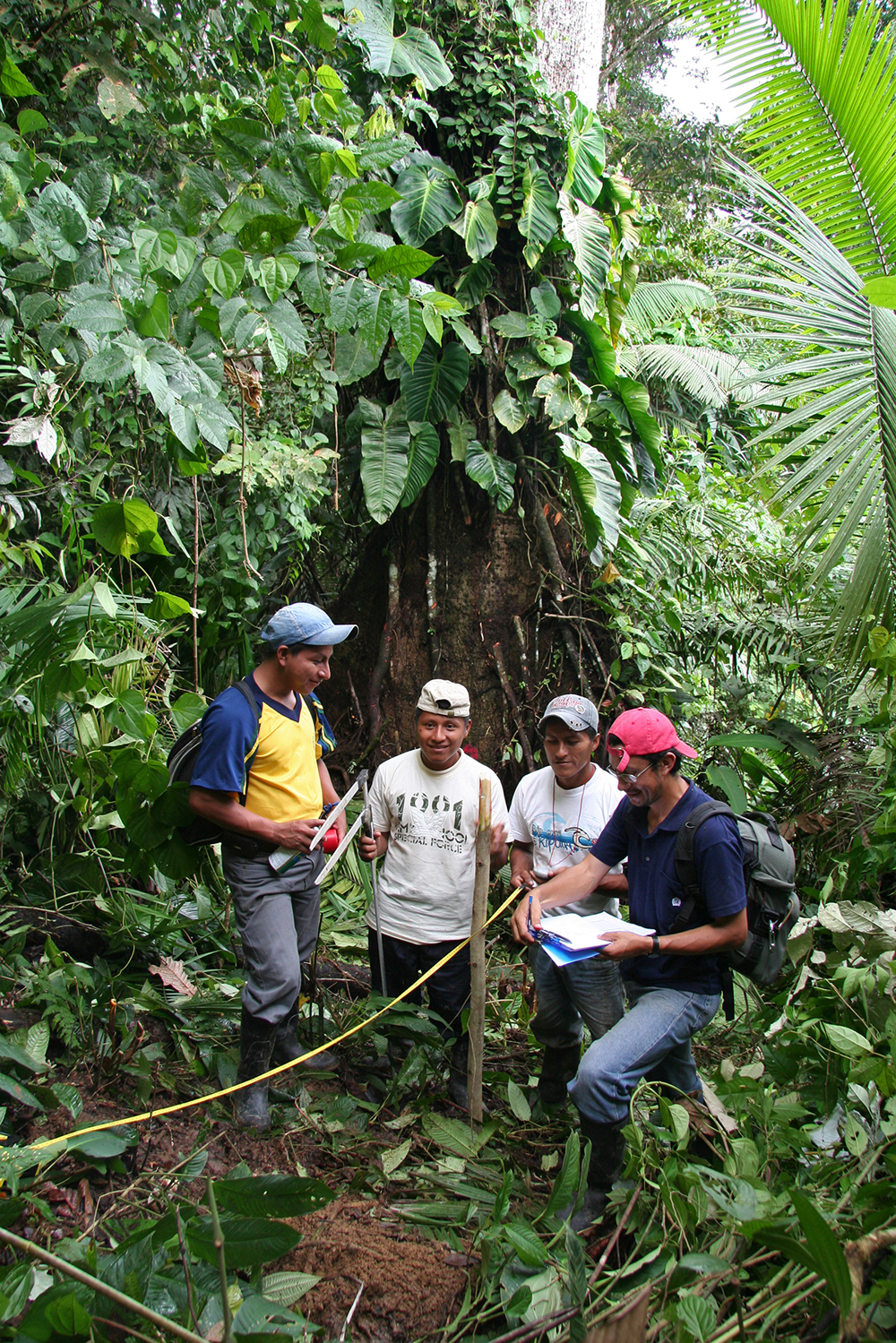
Awá people with employees of the Federacion Awá of Ecuador in the lowland rainforest within the Awá territory

Rettet den Regenwald (Rainforest Rescue) cooperates with German and international environmental, social and human rights organizations. Among them are: Rainforest Foundation (UK), Amazonwatch (United States), Rainforest Information Centre (Australia), Rainforest Action Network (USA), Rainforest Relief (USA), Environmental Defense (USA), Acción Ecológica (Ecuador), DECOIN (Ecuador), Fundación del Río (Nicaragua), Save Our Borneo (Indonesia), JATAM (Indonesia), WALHI (Indonesia), Aldaw (Philippines) and many more.

== Program ==
The main activities are:

- organization of protest actions against the destruction of tropical rainforests by lumber dealers, oil and mining companies and development projects
- support of NGOs in Africa, Latin America, Indonesia and the Philippines
- publication of a quarterly journal called “Rainforest Report“ (available only in German)
- provide information for schools and the media
