= Ecological debt =

Environmental debt between Global North and South

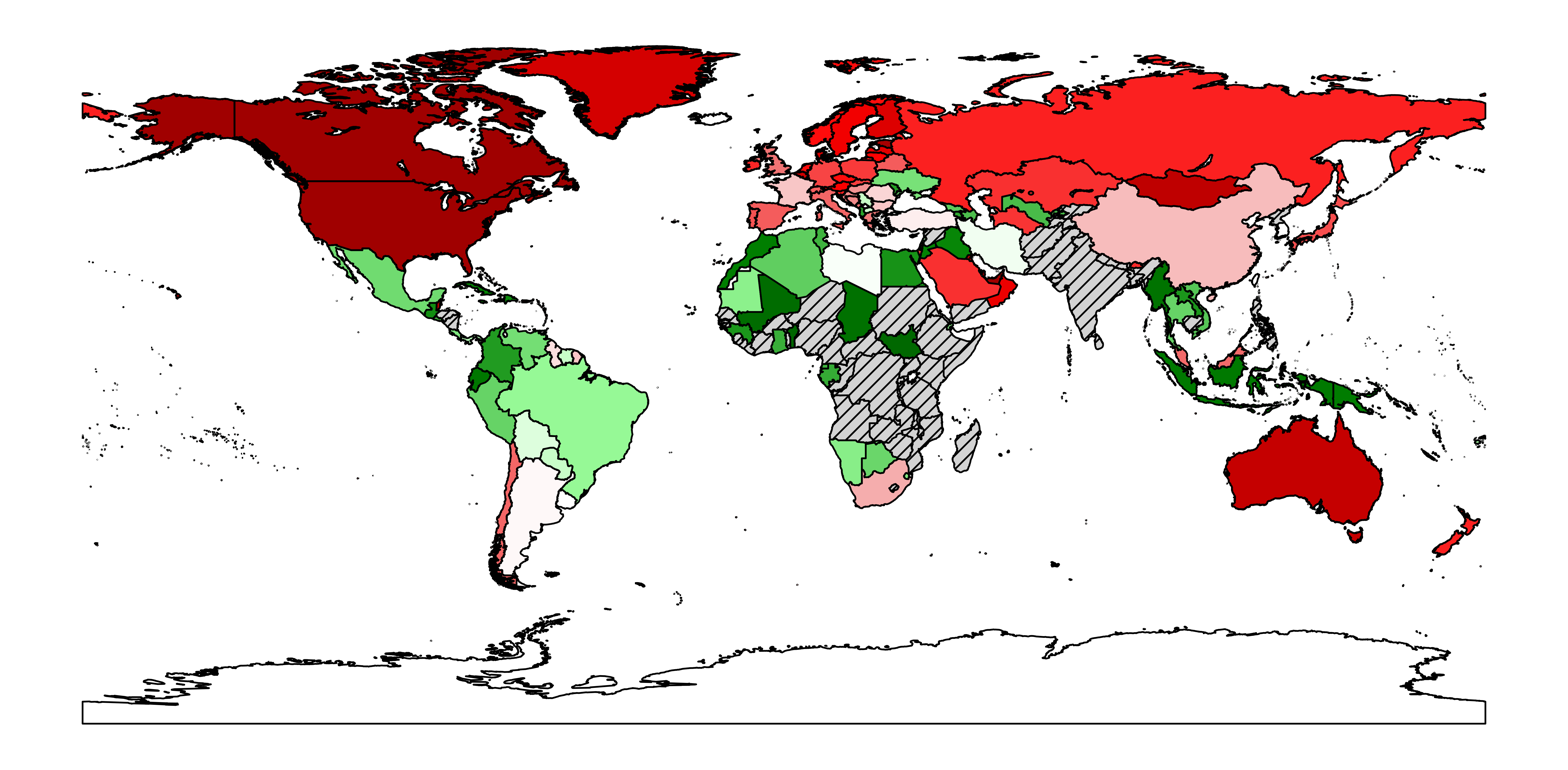
The Global North consumption is higher than its production (shown by the red color), while the Global South produces more than consumes (green color). The resource proportion between consumption and production relates to the amount of environmental degradation.

Ecological debt refers to the accumulated debt seen by some campaigners as owed by the Global North to Global South countries, due to the net sum of historical environmental injustice, especially through resource exploitation, habitat degradation, and pollution by waste discharge. The concept was coined by Global Southerner non-governmental organizations in the 1990s and its definition has varied over the years, in several attempts of greater specification.

Within the ecological debt broad definition, there are two main aspects: the ecological damage caused over time by a country in one or other countries or to ecosystems beyond national jurisdiction through its production and consumption patterns; and the exploitation or use of ecosystems over time by a country at the expense of the equitable rights to these ecosystems by other countries.

== History ==
The term 'ecological debt' first appeared on paper in 1985, in a yellow booklet with the title "Women in movement" made by the German ecofeminist Eva Quistorp and edited by the Green Party in Germany in 1985. The work was intended to be used for a workshop she gave on 'women, peace and ecology' in Nairobi during the United Nation Women's Conference (the first workshop of this kind).

In 1992, the term appeared again in two reports published in different places around the world: "Deuda ecológica" by Robleto and Marcelo in Chile and "Miljöskulden" by Jernelöv in Sweden. Robleto and Marcelo's report, published by the critical NGO Instituto de Ecologia Politica (IEP), was a political and activist response to the global environmental negotiations happening during the Rio Summit. It shed light on the debate occurring in Latin America since the 1980s about the crucial nature's heritage that had been consumed and not returned (i.e. ecological debt). On the other hand, Jernelöv's report goal was to calculate the Swedish debt for future generations and was intended to serve nationally for the Swedish Environmental Advisory. Although the last one had less world-wide influence in the concept's debate, both reports have opposite approach in considering the ecological debt: Robleto and Marcelo's report expresses it in symbolic terms, focusing on the moral and political aspects, whereas Jernelöv's report tries to quantify and monetize it in economic terms.

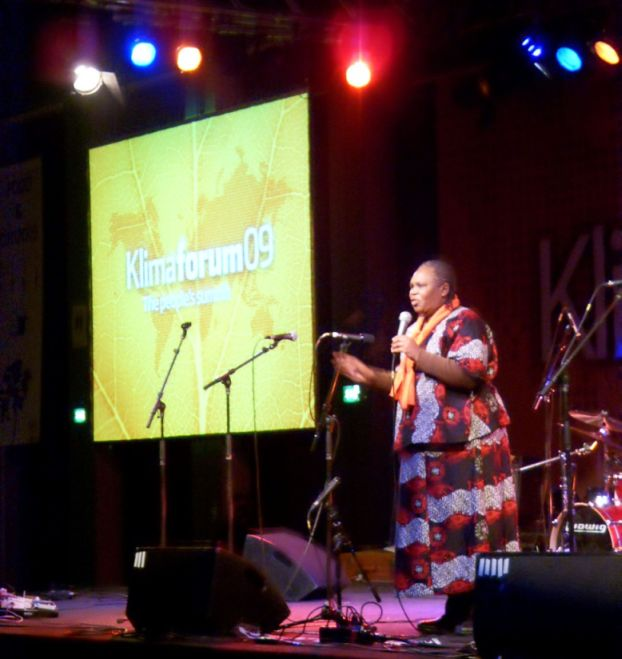
Wahu Kaara (Global justice activist / Kenya Debt Relief Network) spoke at the closing ceremony of Klimaforum09 – People's Climate Summit in Copenhagen December 2009.

In 1994, the Colombian lawyer Borrero, wrote a book on ecological debt. It referred to the environmental liabilities of Northern countries for the excessive per capita production of greenhouse gases, historically and at present. The concept has then been reused by some environmental organizations from the Global south. Campaigns on the ecological debt were launched since 1997 by Accion Ecologica of Ecuador and Friends of the Earth.

Overall, the ecological debt 'movement' was born of the convergence of three main factors during the 80s–90s: 1) the consequences of the debt crisis in the 70s due to the Volcker shocks or the drastic increase of interest rates (followed by structural adjustments made by the US to solve the stagflation in 1981, and thus putting heavily indebted third world countries in an impossible situation in regards to debt repayment); 2) the rising of environmental awareness as seen previously (activists and NGOs attending the Rio Summit in 1992); 3) an increase in recognition of the violence caused by colonialism over the years (the demand of recognition is over 500 years, since Columbus arrived in North America).

In 2009, ecofeminist scholar Ariel Salleh explained how the capitalist processes at work in the global North exploit nature and people simultaneously, ultimately sustaining a large ecological debt in her article, "Ecological Debt: Embodied Debt". At the 1992 Rio Earth Summit, politicians and corporate leaders from the global North introduced the supposed solution for the foreign debt crisis in the global South. They proposed 'debt for nature swaps', which essentially means that those countries that possess abundant biodiversity and environmental resources would give them up to the global North in return for the World Bank reducing their debt.

Feminist environmentalists, Indigenous activists, and peasants from the Global South, exposed how the Global North is much more indebted to the Global South. Salleh justified this by explaining how the 500-year-long colonization process involving the extraction of resources has caused immense damage and destruction to the ecosystem of the Global South. In fact, scientists at the US National Academy for Sciences state that in the time period of 1961–2000, by analyzing the cost of greenhouse gas emissions created by the rich (the Global North) alone, it has become apparent that the rich have imposed climate changes on the poor that greatly outweigh the poor's foreign debt. All of this environmental degradation amounts to ecological debt, seizing the people's livelihood resources in the Global South.

In 2009 as well, Andrew Simms used the ecological debt in a more bio-physical way and defined it as the consumption of resources from within an ecosystem that exceeds the system's regenerative capacity. This is seen in particular in non-renewable resources wherein consumption outstrips production. In a general sense in his work, it refers to the depletion of global resources beyond the Earth's ability to regenerate them. The concept in this sense is based on the bio-physical carrying capacity of an ecosystem; through measuring ecological footprints human society can determine the rate at which it is depleting natural resources. Recent writings have highlighted the ubiquity of ecological debts, such as to Pacific salmon populations, groundwater and polluted waterways. Ultimately, the imperative of sustainability requires human society to live within the means of the ecological system to support life over the long term. Ecological debt is a feature of unsustainable economic systems.

== Political dimension ==
=== Historical context ===
There have been several debates around the notion of ecological debt, and this is mostly because the concept arises from various social movements in response to the distributional injustice of climate change's consequences on the environment and people's livelihood.

Salleh, in particular, showed how the ecological debt manifested in the destruction of the environment and associated climate change the North has created is made possible through the process of modernization and capitalism. The rise of the nature-culture divide that emerged due to rapid industrialisation is a perfect illustration of a human-nature dualism in which human being has the central role above everything else. The notion of humans being embedded in the ecosystem that they live in is crucial to the discipline of political ecology.

In political ecology, which reconnects nature and the economy, ecological debt is crucial because it recognizes that colonization has not only resulted in a loss of culture, way of life, and language for Indigenous peoples, but it has shaped the world economy into one that monetizes and commodifies the environment. For example, when the Colonization of south america occurred over 500 years ago, European settlers brought with them their Eurocentric values, seeing themselves as better than and therefore entitled to the Indigenous people's knowledge and the land they lived on. In a perceived postcolonial world, large corporations and Western governments tend to present solutions to global warming by commodifying nature and hoping to make a profit out of it. This better-than-thou attitude has created the conditions for global warming to occur, making the North's ecological footprint soar, while also constructing an ecological debt so large as to completely rid the entire Global South of their financial debt.

During the Rio Earth Summit in 1992, attending NGOs created the Debt Treaty, a document gathering all information to better define the ecological debt concept. They demanded compensation for damages over 500 years (1992 is exactly 500 years after the arrival of Columbus in North America). The countries in question were given options from the World Bank and the International Money Fund a choice to defaulting on these debts or make structural adjustments to continue to receive further funding. It was the first push back, reversing the stream, but it stayed as a draft paper not recognized by international institutions or lead countries at that time.

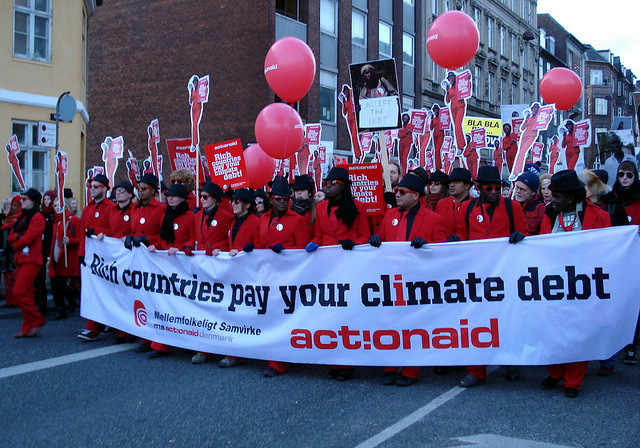
Copenhagen Climate Summit in 2009 – Action Aid demonstration

=== Today ===
In the 2000s two networks were created and still exist today: the Southern Peoples Ecological Debt Creditors Alliance (SPEDCA) which is a network of creditors that launched a campaign for the recognition of ecological debt, and the European Network for the Recognition of Ecological Debt (ENRED) which is a network of debtors.

During the COP in Copenhagen in December 2009, some governments from developing countries or countries most vulnerable to climate change consequences (such as Bolivia, Mauritania, Chad, or island countries as Maldives or Haiti) have argued that the principle of shared responsibility demands that rich nations or developed economies (such as the United States, some European countries, China) go beyond donations or adaptation credits and make reparations that recognize an ecological debt for excessive pollution over several decades. The top United States ambassador, Todd Stern, flatly rejected arguments by diplomats from these countries that the United States owed such a debt.

The COP 21 in Paris brought minor progress with an increase in financial aid for developing countries. Although the goal was to prepare future action to be undertaken for adapting to climate change and consider loss and damages (especially displaced people) of some countries, no real action was adopted. There were no recognition of responsibilities but recommendations only.

== Calculations ==
=== Climate debt ===
When discussing ecological debt, climate debt appears to be the only example of a scientific attempt to quantify the debt. It incorporates two different elements: the adaptation debt which is the cost to communities of adapting to climate damages they are not responsible for, and the consumption debt or emission's debt which is compensation due for emitting carbon in the present time. Emission debts should hypothetically be paid for by those countries that have over-emitted their fair-share of emissions. To determine this debt, an emissions or carbon budget can and is calculated, and distributed among countries.

=== Calculations ===
Academic work on calculations of the ecological debt came later. An article published in 2008 looked at the distribution of ecological impacts for various human activities. Studies were also produced at regional level within countries, for instance for Orissa in India.

As seen previously, calculation of the ecological debt implies various aspects related to political ecology. While calculating the amount of emissions, some scholars have disregard inequalities of emissions from the past whereas others have considered historical accountability. In addition, there is a connection between ecological issues and the economy due to the value natural resources have and the important role they play in benefiting our economy.

In 2000 Neumayer calculated what he named the 'historical emissions debt', consisting on the difference in emissions of actual historical emissions (from a specific date in the past) and equal per-capita emissions (current emissions).

Theoretically it may be possible to put a money value on ecological debt by calculating the value of the environmental and social externalities associated with historic resource extraction and adding an estimated value for the share of global pollution problems borne by poor countries as the result of higher consumption levels in rich ones. This includes efforts to value the external costs associated with climate change.

In 2015 Matthews proposed a method to calculate the ecological debt, by looking at the accumulated `carbon debts' for each country. The model uses historical estimates of national fossil fuel CO_{2} emissions and population and this since 1960. Furthermore, it runs a comparison between temperature changes each year by each country's emissions compared to a proportional temperature change of each country's share of the world population (this same year). This gives the accumulated credits and debts related to a larger range of emissions and the 'climate debts' obtained would be the difference between the actual temperature change (caused by each country) and their per-capita share of global temperature change.

Other scholars have proposed a different approach, a `modified equal shares' approach, that would consider each country's basic needs and would weight each ones' share of emissions. However, this approach brings potential ethical and political difficulties to quantitatively defining what would thus be the equal shares.

== Key debates ==
Although some recent emerging countries have participated in the increase of carbon emissions, the situation tend to stay uneven in-between developing and developed countries regarding who is affected the most versus who pollutes the most.

Recent studies on ecological debt focus more on sub-topics as the notion of historical responsibility (whether or not a country is considered ethically responsible or accountable for carbon emissions prior 1990, i.e. when global warming was universally recognized), the components of climate debt (see above sections), the difficulties in deciding when to start counting past emissions and if this debate is slowing the implementation of programs or the legal and political consecration of the debt through treaties.

Some concerns are brought up that focus on intergenerational ecological debt. This specifically highlights how current generations are responsible for preserving ecological integrity for future generations. Recent studies have put an emphasize on how if current generations continue to use unsustainable resources it will create environmental liabilities that future generations will have to try to fight and rebuild. Scholars argue different ways on how to prevent such debt from being taken on by future generations. Some examples of this are creating things such as the Green Climate Fund whose goal is to raise $100 billion annually to help developing nations cope with climate change.

Present key debates focus on how is the debt going to be paid back. First, some academia have pushed for financial debt cancellation rather than being paid for ecological damages and then paying back the country's national financial debt. However, financial debts were not even agree by people (in developing countries especially) in the first place, calling it the unfair "Volcker debt". Accepting this option could hold the risk of giving legitimize credits to these financial debts. A second solution proposed is the Basic income guarantee (BIG) or the universal basic income. It consists on regular cash payments to everyone in a community (or country) and has proven a certain efficacy in some places around the world (like Namibia).

Another debate addresses the fact that the ecological debt risks "commodifying nature" is exhausting ecosystem services. Researchers have tackled this risk by showing how it will expand the inclination of objectifying, monetizing and ultimately commodifying nature. Moreover, the language of debt, repayments, credits and so forth is understood in Northern countries mostly, and is mostly focused on recognition of wrongdoing but not payment for loss of services for instance.

== Resources ==
=== Books ===
- Ecological debt: the health of the planet and the wealth of nations, Andrew Simms, Pluto books, 2005
- Larkin, Amy (2013). Environmental Debt: The Hidden Costs of a Changing Global Economy ISBN 9781137278555

=== Reports ===
- Ecological debt. History, meaning and relevance for environmental justice, Warlenius, R. et al., 2015
- J. Timmons Roberts and Bradley C. Parks (2009). "Ecologically Unequal Exchange, Ecological Debt, and Climate Justice: The History and Implications of Three Related Ideas for a New Social Movement". International Journal of Comparative Sociology. 50 (3–4): 381–408. doi:10.1177/0020715209105147. S2CID 143911217.
- James Rice (2009). "North-South Relations and the Ecological Debt: Asserting a Counter-Hegemonic Discourse". Critical Sociology. 35 (2): 225–252. doi:10.1177/0896920508099193. S2CID 145372698.
- Towards a Level Playing Field, Repaying Ecological Debt, or Making Environmental Space: Three Stories about International Environmental Cooperation, Osgoode Hall Law Journal, 2005, VOL 43; NUMB 1/2, pages 137–170
- Elaboration of the concept of ecological debt, Centre for Sustainable Development, Ghent University, 2004
- Credit Where it's Due: The Ecological Debt Education Project, Friends of the Earth Scotland, 2003
- Who owes who?: Climate change, debt, equity and survival, Christian Aid, 1999

== See also ==
- Carbon footprint
- Carrying capacity
- Ecological economics
- Ecological footprint
- Environmental racism
- Green imperialism
