= Magdalena León =

Magdalena León can refer to:

- Magdalena León de Leal (born 1939), Colombian feminist sociologist
- Magdalena León Trujillo (born 1959), Ecuadorian economist and researcher specializing in feminist economics
