= Climate justice =

Concept for social justice in climate change context

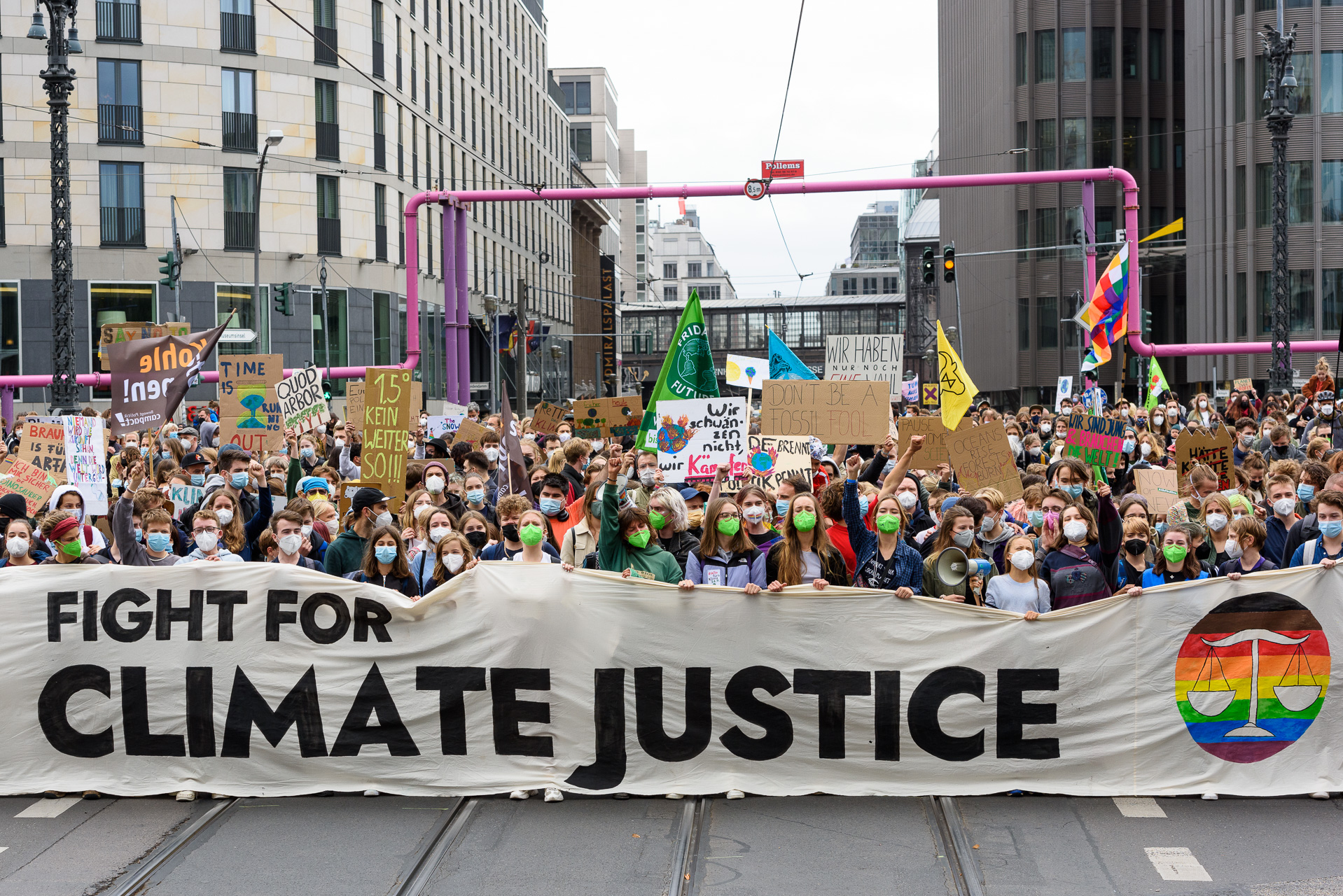
Fridays for Future demonstration in Berlin in September 2021 with the slogan "fight for climate justice"

Climate justice is a type of environmental justice that focuses on the unequal impacts of climate change on marginalized or otherwise vulnerable populations. Climate justice seeks to achieve an equitable distribution of both the burdens of climate change and the efforts to mitigate climate change through advocacy and policy change. The economic burden of climate change mitigation is estimated by some at around 1% to 2% of GDP. Climate justice examines concepts such as equality, human rights, collective rights, justice and the historical responsibilities for climate change.

Climate justice recognizes that those who have benefited most from industrialization (such as coal, oil, and gas enterprises) are disproportionately responsible for the accumulation of carbon dioxide in the earth's atmosphere, and thus for climate change. Meanwhile, there is growing consensus that people in regions that are the least responsible for climate change as well as the world's poorest and most marginalized communities often tend to suffer the greatest consequences, with, for example, health problems due to being raised in an unhealthy environment. Depending on the country and context, this will often include people with low-incomes, indigenous communities or communities of color. They might also be further disadvantaged by responses to climate change which might exacerbate existing inequalities around race, gender, sexuality and disability. When those affected the most by climate change despite having contributed the least to causing it are also negatively affected by responses to climate change, this is known as the 'triple injustice' of climate change.

Conceptions of climate justice can be grouped along the lines of procedural justice and distributive justice. The former stresses fair, transparent and inclusive decision-making. The latter stresses a fair distribution of the costs and outcomes of climate change (substantive rights). There are at least ten different principles that are helpful to distribute climate costs fairly. Climate justice also tries to address the social implications of climate change mitigation. If these are not addressed properly, this could result in profound economic and social tensions. It could even lead to delays in necessary changes.

Climate justice actions can include the growing global body of climate litigation. In 2017, a report of the United Nations Environment Programme identified 894 ongoing legal actions worldwide.

== Definition and objectives ==
Use and popularity of climate justice language has increased dramatically in recent years, yet climate justice is understood in many ways, and the different meanings are sometimes contested. At its simplest, conceptions of climate justice can be grouped along the following two lines:

- procedural justice, which emphasizes fair, transparent and inclusive decision making, and
- distributive justice, which places the emphasis on who bears the costs of both climate change and the actions taken to address it.

The objectives of climate justice can be described as: "to encompasses a set of rights and obligations, which corporations, individuals and governments have towards those vulnerable people who will be in a way significantly disproportionately affected by climate change."

Climate justice examines concepts such as equality, human rights, collective rights, and the historical responsibilities for climate change. There are procedural dimensions of climate change mitigation, as well as distributive ethical ones. Recognition and respect are the underlying basis for distributive and procedural justice. Research on tourism governance has further examined whether knowledge is not only included in climate decision-making but also authorised to shape it, describing the disconnect between inclusion and authorisation as an "authorisation gap".

Related fields are environmental justice and social justice.

== Causes of injustice ==
=== Economic systems ===
Among major emitters, the US has higher annual per capita emissions than China, which has more total annual emissions.

Cumulatively, US and China emissions have caused the most greenhouse gas-related economic damage.

The fundamental differences in economic systems, such as capitalism and socialism as a root cause of climate injustice is an often debated and contentious issue. In this context, fundamental disagreements arise between conservative environmental groups on one side and leftist organizations on the other. While the former often tend to blame the excesses of neoliberalism for climate change and argue in favor of market-based reform within capitalism, the latter view capitalism with its exploitative traits as the underlying central issue. Other possible causal explanations include hierarchies based on the group differences and the nature of the fossil fuel industry itself.

=== Systemic causes ===
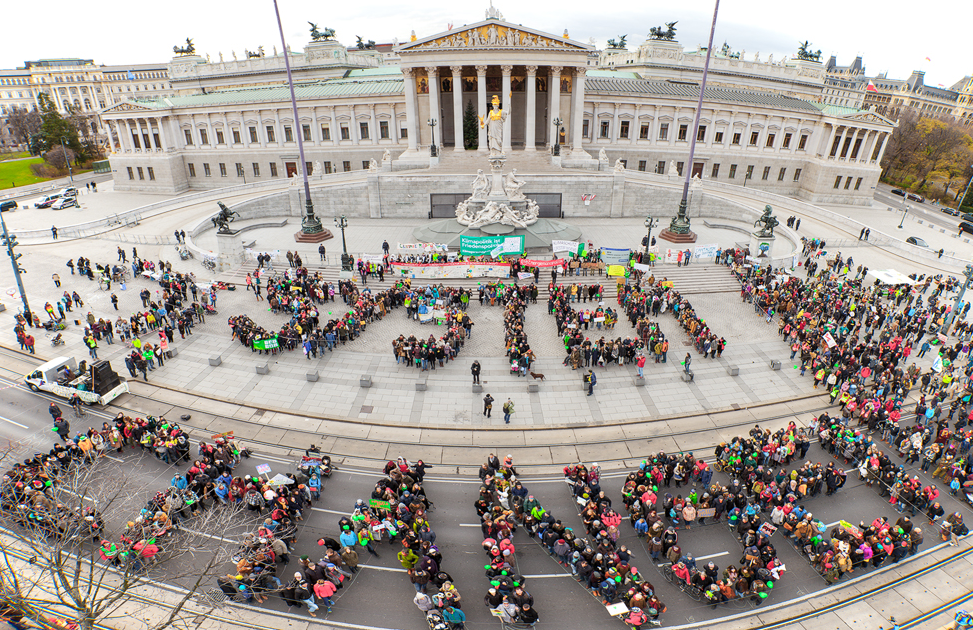
Many participants of grassroots movements that demand climate justice also ask for system change.

The unwarranted rate of climate change, along with its inequality of burdens, are seen as structural injustice perpetuated by systemic issues. There is political responsibility for the maintenance and support of existing structural processes. This is despite assumed viable potential alternative models based on novel technologies and means. As a criterion for determining responsibility for climate change, individual causal contribution does not matter as much as responsibility for the perpetuation of carbon-intensive practices and institutions. It has been argued that these systemic issues have evolved from and been perpetuated by a long history of practices such as colonization. These systemic causes have differing effects on the groups they are creating issues for. For example, issues with pipelines and oil drilling in the United States often stem from the fact that pipelines are built on Indigenous land. Because of the systems of oppression such as colonialism and settler colonialism that have made Indigenous communities more susceptible to being treated as expendable, it is often difficult for these communities to take action against large corporations. Systemically related climate justice issues are seen globally, especially in places where colonization has occurred (i.e. Gaelic Ireland, Scotland, Australia, India, etc.) These structures constitute the global politico-economic system, rather than enabling structural changes towards a system that does not facilitate exploitation of people and nature.

For others, climate justice could be pursued through existing economic frameworks, global organizations and policy mechanisms. Therefore, the root causes could be found in the causes that so far inhibited global implementation of measures like emissions trading schemes.

=== Disproportionality between causality and burden ===
Emissions of the richest 1% are more than twice that of the poorest 50%. Compliance with the Paris Agreement's 1.5°C goal would require the richest 1% to reduce emissions by at least 30 times, while per-person emissions of the poorest 50% could approximately triple.

Though total CO_{2} emissions (size of pie charts) differ substantially among high-emitting regions, the pattern of higher income classes emitting more than lower income classes is consistent across regions. The world's top 1% of emitters emit over 1000 times more than the bottom 1%.

Richer (developed) countries emit more CO_{2} per person than poorer (developing) countries. Emissions are roughly proportional to GDP per person, though the rate of increase diminishes with average GDP/pp of about $10,000.

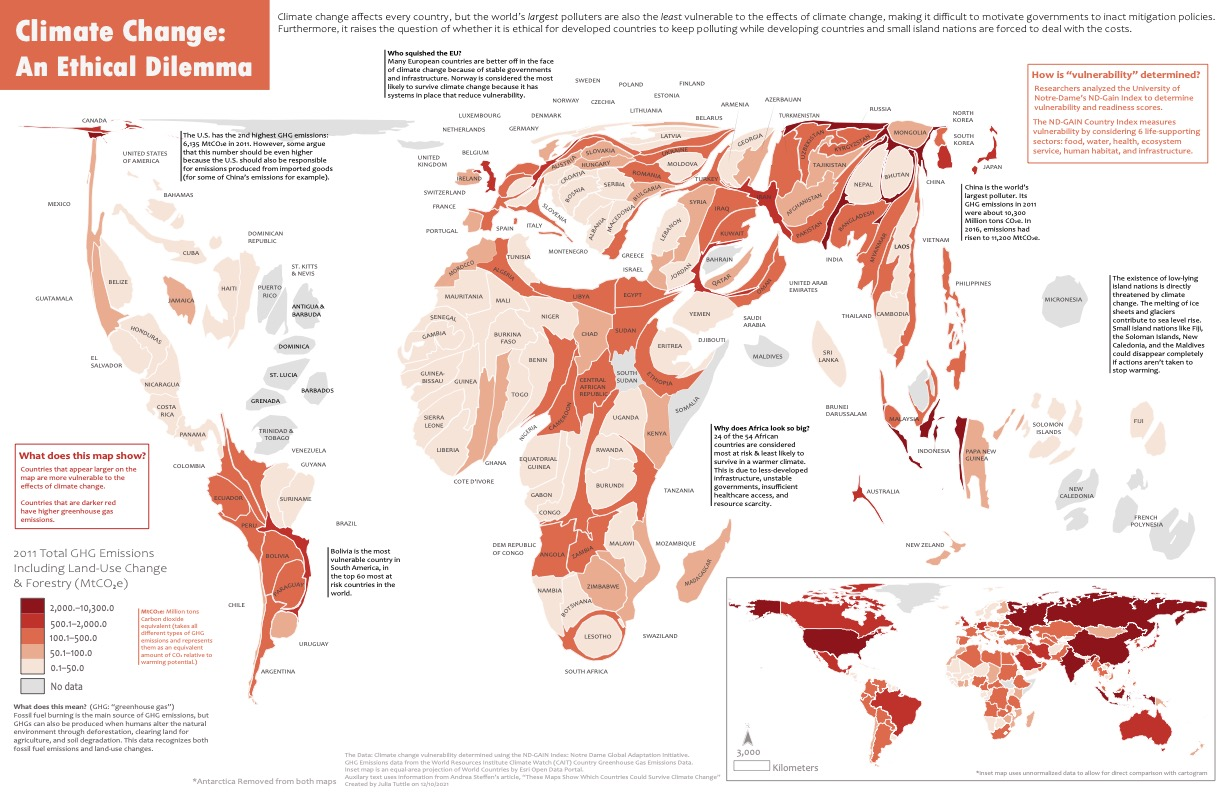
A country-by-country visualisation of each country's vulnerability to effects of climate change (country size) and greenhouse gas emissions (country colour intensity). High emitting countries are generally not the most vulnerable.

The responsibility for climate change differs substantially among individuals and groups. Many of the people and nations most affected by climate change are among the least responsible for it. The most affluent citizens of the world are responsible for most environmental impacts. Robust action by them and their governments is necessary to reduce these impacts.

According to a 2020 report by Oxfam and the Stockholm Environment Institute, the richest 1% of the global population have caused twice as much carbon emissions as the poorest 50% over the 25 years from 1990 to 2015. This was, respectively, during that period, 15% of cumulative emissions compared to 7%. A second 2023 report found the richest 1% of humans produce more carbon emissions than poorest 66%, while the top 10% richest people account for more than half of global carbon emissions.

The bottom half of the population is directly responsible for less than 20% of energy footprints and consume less than the top 5% in terms of trade-corrected energy. High-income people usually have higher energy footprints as they use more energy-intensive goods. In particular, the largest disproportionality was identified to be in the domain of transport, where the top 10% consume 56% of vehicle fuel and conduct 70% of vehicle purchases.

A 2023 review article found that if there were a 2 °C temperature rise by 2100, roughly 1 billion primarily poor people would die as a result of primarily wealthy people's greenhouse gas emissions.

Some already existing effects of climate change hit harder people with high income. The increase of wildfires in the west of the US "have disproportionately been borne by high-income, white, and older residents, and by owners of high-value properties;" This is because those properties have more greenery. There is similar effect with floods.

=== Intergenerational equity ===
Successive generations are predicted to experience progressively greater unprecedented lifetime exposure (ULE) events such as heat waves. About 111 million children born in 2020 will live with unprecedented heatwave exposure in a world that warms by 3.5 °C, compared with 62 million with only 1.5 °C of warming.

Preventable severe effects of climate change are likely to occur during the lifetime of the present adult population. Under current climate policy pledges, children born in 2020 (e.g. "Generation Alpha") will experience over their lifetimes, 2–7 times as many heat waves, as well as more of other extreme weather events compared to people born in 1960. This raises issues of intergenerational equity as it was these generations (individuals and their collective governance and economic systems) who are mainly responsible for the burden of climate change.

This illustrates that emissions produced by any given generation can lock-in damage for one or more future generations. Climate change could progressively become more threatening for the generations affected than for the generation responsible for the threats. The climate system contains tipping points, such as the amount of deforestation of the Amazon that will launch the forest's irreversible decline. A generation whose continued emissions drive the climate system past such significant tipping points inflicts severe injustice on multiple future generations.

=== Disproportionate impacts on disadvantaged groups ===
Disadvantaged groups will continue to be especially impacted as climate change persists. These groups will be affected due to inequalities based on demographic characteristics such as gender, race, ethnicity, age, income, and disabilities. Inequality increases the exposure of disadvantaged groups to harmful effects of climate change. The damage is worsened because disadvantaged groups are last to receive emergency relief and are rarely included in the planning process at local, national and international levels for coping with the impacts of climate change. These are also exacerbated by systematic injustice structures that keep marginalized groups in a state of being seen as expendable by the government. Unless steps are taken to provide these groups with more access to universal resources and protection, disadvantaged groups will continue to suffer the most from climate justice issues.

Communities of color have long been targets of climate related injustices. Systems of racism and colonialism have created power imbalances where communities of color will often suffer when it comes to environmental justice issues. Communities of color are often also low-income communities and suffer from historical injustices like redlining that make it significantly harder to fight back against climate related issues.

Women are also disadvantaged and will be affected by climate change differently than men. Women are more likely to experience gender based violence such as assault and rape and violence will often follow climate justice issues. For example, oil pipelines will frequently house workers in isolated communities known as "man camps". These camps of primarily male workers have been found to bring higher rates of gender based violence to local communities around them, especially for indigenous women. Overall, a history of being seen as lesser and more expendable has made it so women's voices are not valued as much in times of environmental crisis.

Indigenous groups are affected by the consequences of climate change even though they historically have contributed the least to causing it. Indigenous peoples are often initially affected by settler colonialism and displacement by colonizers, which then makes it difficult to establish grounds to fight back against climate injustices. In the United States, Indigenous land is often exploited for resources like oil and critical minerals. Historically, instances like the Dawes Act (1887) have created cases of environmental injustice through the removal of Indigenous peoples from their land. Their land is also often treated as dumping sites for hazardous materials, such as nuclear waste. Indigenous people are unjustly impacted, and they continue to have fewer resources to cope with climate change.

Low-income communities face higher vulnerability to climate change. Low-income communities often become places where companies will establish harmful factories or mining practices, leading to issues like ecological and chemical runoff. An example of this is Norco, Louisiana, where there are multiple oil refineries. It is frequently referred to as "cancer alley". Low-income communities will often be disproportionately impacted by heat waves, air quality, and extreme weather events.

People with disabilities have also faced significant risks associated with climate injustice. During extreme natural disasters, these people experience greater challenges due to lack of accessibility, transportation, and infrastructure. Approximately 80% of people with disabilities live in the low to middle class income countries and have an increased risk of mortality when a disaster arises compared to a person without disabilities. During the winter storm Uri in 2021, power outages created significant difficulties in access to critical medical devices and transportation. Additionally, people with disabilities are often underrepresented in climate-related topics. Including their opinion can help resolve issues with accessibility and inclusivity.

== Responses to improve climate justice ==
Burden on future generations

One generation must not be allowed to consume large portions of the CO_{2} budget while bearing a relatively minor share of the reduction effort if this would involve leaving subsequent generations with a drastic reduction burden and expose their lives to comprehensive losses of freedom.

— German Federal Constitutional Court
April 2021
Conclusion on the Rights of Nature

The rights of nature protect ecosystems and natural processes for their intrinsic value, thus complementing them with the human right to a healthy and ecologically balanced environment. The rights of nature, like all constitutional rights, are justiciable and, consequently, judges are obliged to guarantee them.

— Constitutional Court of Ecuador
10 November 2021

=== Common principles of justice in burden-sharing ===
There are three principles of justice in burden-sharing that can be used in making decisions on who bears the larger burdens of climate change globally and domestically: a) those who most caused the problem, b) those who have the most burden-carrying ability and c) those who have benefited most from the activities that cause climate change. A 2023 study estimated that the top 21 fossil fuel companies would owe cumulative climate reparations of $5.4 trillion over the period 2025–2050. To address such inequalities in practice, some cities have begun to address these inequalities through intersectional adaptation policies. Barcelona, for example, has implemented intersectional climate justice measures that include regulating short-term rentals, providing property tax support, and requiring 30% of new housing developments to be social housing units.

Another method of decision-making starts from the objective of preventing climate change e.g. beyond 1.5 °C, and from there reasons backwards to who should do what. This makes use of the principles of justice in burden-sharing to maintain fairness.

=== Court cases and litigation ===
Existential problem of planetary proportions

(Climate change is) an existential problem of planetary proportions that imperils all forms of life and the very health of our planet. ... A complete solution to this daunting, and self-inflicted, problem requires the contribution of all fields of human knowledge, whether law, science, economics or any other.

— International Court of Justice advisory opinion regarding Obligations of States in respect of climate change
26 July 2025

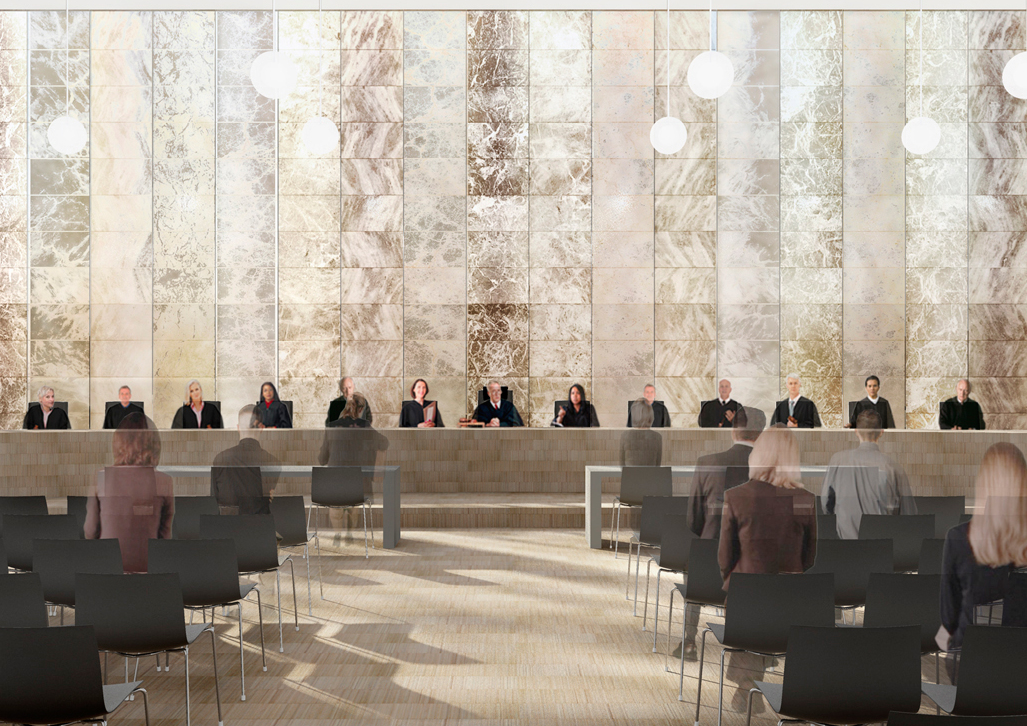
In 2019, the Supreme Court of the Netherlands confirmed that the government must cut carbon dioxide emissions further, as climate change threatens citizens' human rights.

By December 2022, the number of climate change-related lawsuits had grown to 2,180, more than half in the US (1,522 lawsuits). The organization Our Children's Trust filed a lawsuit on the basis that the government had been ineffective in protecting the constitutional rights to life, liberty and protection of the youth of the United States. Based on existing laws, some relevant parties can already be forced into action by means of courts, such as with ie Saúl V. RWE.

Climate change litigation, also known as climate litigation, is an emerging body of environmental law using legal practice to set case law precedent to further climate change mitigation efforts from public institutions and private entities. In the face of slow climate change politics delaying climate change mitigation, activists and lawyers have increased efforts to use sub-national, national, regional, and international judicial and quasi-judicial systems to advance the effort. Climate litigation typically engages in one of five types of legal claims: Constitutional law (focused on breaches of constitutional rights by the state), administrative law (challenging the merits of administrative decision making), private law (challenging corporations or other organizations for negligence, nuisance, etc.), fraud or consumer protection (challenging companies for misrepresenting information about climate impacts), or human rights (claiming that failure to act on climate change is a failure to protect human rights). Litigants pursuing such cases have had mixed results.

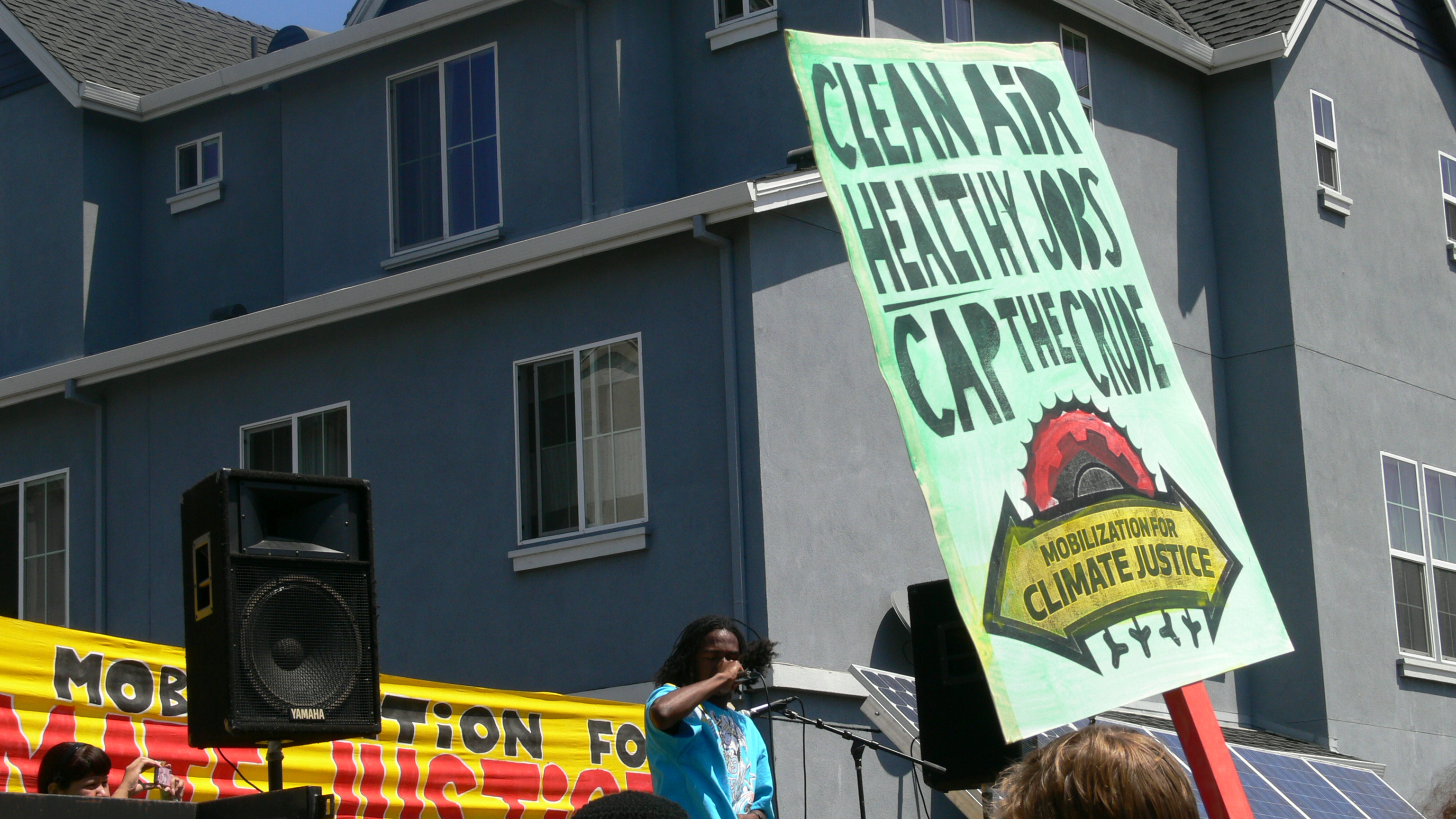
Rally for climate justice: Mass mobilization at the Chevron Oil Refinery in Richmond, California (2009)

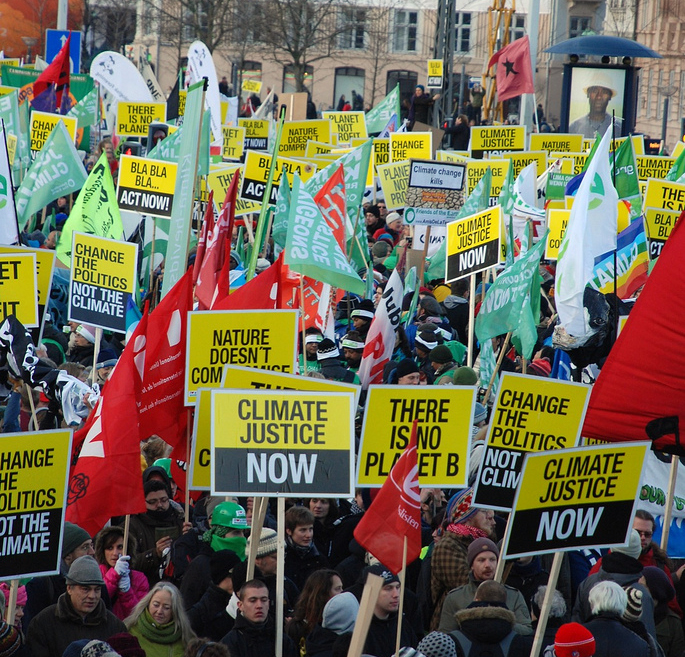
Tens of thousands marching in Copenhagen for climate justice (2009)

=== Human rights ===
The COP26 Climate Change Conference...

... acknowledging that climate change is a common concern of humankind, Parties should, when taking action to address climate change, respect, promote and consider their respective obligations on human rights, the right to health, the rights of indigenous peoples, local communities, migrants, children, persons with disabilities and people in vulnerable situations and the right to development, as well as gender equality, empowerment of women and intergenerational equity, ...

— The Glasgow climate pact
13 November 2021

Human rights and climate change is a conceptual and legal framework under which international human rights and their relationship to global warming are studied, analyzed, and addressed. The framework has been employed by governments, United Nations organizations, intergovernmental and non-governmental organizations, human rights and environmental advocates, and academics to guide national and international policy on climate change under the United Nations Framework Convention on Climate Change (UNFCCC) and the core international human rights instruments. In 2022 Working Group II of the IPCC suggested that "climate justice comprises justice that links development and human rights to achieve a rights-based approach to addressing climate change".

== Challenges ==
=== Societal disruption and policy support ===
Climate justice may often conflict with social stability. For example, interventions that establish more just product pricing could result in social unrest. Decarbonization interventions could lead to decreased material possessions, comfort, maintained habits.

Multiple studies estimate that if a rapid transition were to be implemented the number of jobs could increase overall at least temporarily due to increased demand for labor to e.g. build public infrastructure and other green jobs to build the renewable energy system.

The urgent need for changes, especially when seeking to facilitate lifestyle-changes and shifts on an industry scale, could lead to social tension and decrease levels of public support for political parties in power. For instance, keeping gas prices low is often "really good for the poor and the middle class". Additionally, according to sociologist David Pellow and critical geographer Laura Pulido, the state is often complicit in environmental justice issues due to the economic benefits seen from ignoring climate injustices. This can create significant barriers to climate justice movements as it makes it more difficult to make progress through actions like lawmaking and protesting. Documents have been made to try to counter this neglect such as the Bali Principles of Climate Justice. The principles call for the importance of communities coming together when trying to make changes in times when the state remains complicit in injustices.

Despite commonly held beliefs, people in rich nations are sometimes willing to give money to poorer nations to help stop climate change. According to one study conducted by Social Science Research Network scientists and published in May 2023, distribution of money from the rich to the poor through a global emissions trading scheme is supported by 76% of Europeans and 54% of the US citizens. Whether or not this actually occurs is yet to be seen.

=== Loss and damage discussions ===
Some may see climate justice arguments for compensation by rich countries for natural disasters in developing countries as a way for "limitless liability". High levels of compensations could drain a society's resources, efforts, focus and financial funds away from efficient preventive climate change mitigation towards e.g. immediate climate change relief compensations.

=== Fossil-fuels dependent states ===
The US, China and Russia have cumulatively contributed the greatest amounts of CO_{2} since 1850.

Many of the heaviest users of fossil fuels rely on them for a high percentage of their electricity.

Fossil fuel phase out is projected to affect states and their citizens with large or central industries of fossil-fuels extraction – including OPEC states – differently than other nations. These states have obstructed climate negotiations and it has been argued that, due to their wealth, they should not need to receive financial support from other countries but could implement adequate transitions on their own in terms of financial resources.

A study suggested governments of nations that have historically benefited from extraction should take the lead, with countries that have a high dependency on fossil fuels but low capacity for transition needing some support to follow. In particular, transitional impacts of a rapid extraction phase-out is thought to be better absorbed in diversified, wealthier economies as they may have more capacities for enacting absorptive socioeconomic policies.

=== Conflicting interest-driven interpretations as barriers to agreements ===
Net income of the global oil and gas industry reached a record US$4 trillion in 2022.

Different interpretations and perspectives, arising from different interests, needs, circumstances, expectations, considerations and histories, can lead to highly varying ideas of what is fair. This may make it more difficult for countries to reach an agreement. Developing effective, legitimate and enforceable agreements could be complicated. This is especially the case if traditional methods or tools of policy-making are used.

Fundamental fairness principles could include: Responsibility, capability and rights (needs). For these principles, country characteristics can predict relative support.

After recovering from the COVID-19 pandemic, energy company profits increased with greater revenues from higher fuel prices resulting from the Russian invasion of Ukraine, falling debt levels, tax write-downs of projects shut down in Russia, and backing off from earlier plans to reduce greenhouse gas emissions. Record profits sparked public calls for windfall taxes.

== History ==
Developed countries, as the main cause of climate change, in assuming their historical responsibility, must recognize and honor their climate debt in all of its dimensions as the basis for a just, effective, and scientific solution to climate change. (...) The focus must not be only on financial compensation, but also on restorative justice, understood as the restitution of integrity to our Mother Earth and all its beings.

— World People's Conference on Climate Change and the Rights of Mother Earth, People's Agreement, April 2010, Cochabamba, Bolivia

Though the US's per capita and per GDP emissions have declined significantly, the raw numerical decline in emissions is much less substantial. Growing populations and increased economic activity work against mitigation attempts.

The concept of climate justice was deeply influential on climate negotiations years before the term "climate justice" was regularly applied to the concept. There have since been a multitude of frameworks written and used in environmental legislature such as the 2002 Bali Principles of Climate Justice.

Climate justice issues have been found to have roots in historical inequities and exploitative practices. A prime example of this are the climate justice issues that have stemmed from colonialism. These issues, while specific to their location, often have very similar roots and effects worldwide. According to environmental scholars such as Kyle Powys Whyte, Zoe Todd, and Dina Gilio-Whitaker, early colonization was focused on extraction and included practices such as clear cutting and unsustainable agriculture as a means of getting as many resources out of the land as possible. Examples of this have been seen worldwide, with the British colonialism that took place in Ireland being seen as a predecessor of what would eventually occur in the United States. These practices also affected Indigenous populations, creating areas where environmental justice violations could easily take place. Concepts like Manifest Destiny and laws like the Indian Removal Act (1830) and Dawes Act (1887) allowed for the exploitation of these communities in pursuit of expansion and progress.

The concept of climate justice was deeply influential on climate negotiations years before the term "climate justice" was regularly applied to the concept. In December 1990 the United Nations appointed an Intergovernmental Negotiating Committee (INC) to draft what became the Framework Convention on Climate Change (FCCC), adopted at the UN Conference on the Environment and Development (UNCED) in Rio de Janeiro in June 1992. As the name "Environment and Development" indicated, the fundamental goal was to coordinate action on climate change with action on sustainable development. It was impossible to draft the text of the FCCC without confronting central questions of climate justice concerning how to share the responsibilities of slowing climate change fairly between developed nations and developing nations.

The issue of the fair terms for sharing responsibility was raised forcefully for the INC by statements about climate justice from developing countries. In response, the FCCC adopted the now-famous (and still-contentious) principles of climate justice embodied in Article 3.1: "The Parties should protect the climate system for the benefit of present and future generations of humankind, on the basis of equity and in accordance with their common but differentiated responsibilities and respective capabilities. Accordingly, the developed country Parties should take the lead in combating climate change and the adverse effects thereof." The first principle of climate justice embedded in Article 3.1 is that calculations of benefits (and burdens) must include not only those for the present generation but also those for future generations. The second is that responsibilities are "common but differentiated", that is, every country has some responsibilities, but equitable responsibilities are different for different types of countries. The third is that a crucial instance of different responsibilities is that in fairness developed countries' responsibilities must be greater. How much greater continues to be debated politically.

In 2000, at the same time as the Sixth Conference of the Parties (COP 6), the first Climate Justice Summit took place in The Hague. This summit aimed to "affirm that climate change is a rights issue" and to "build alliances across states and borders" against climate change and in favor of sustainable development.

Subsequently, in August–September 2002, international environmental groups met in Johannesburg for the Earth Summit. At this summit, also known as Rio+10, as it took place ten years after the 1992 Earth Summit, the Bali Principles of Climate Justice were adopted. These framed the issues of climate justice as a social and human rights issue rather than focusing on them as a technical or logistical problem. There is an emphasis on the importance of the right to life and the importance of community in the protection of environmental rights. The Bali Principles push for offending parties, such as the oil industry and Global North Nations take responsibility for climate change. They also discuss the issues with equity between disadvantaged groups and encourage protecting of the environment for the sake of future generations.

Climate Justice affirms the rights of communities dependent on natural resources for their livelihood and cultures to own and manage the same in a sustainable manner, and is opposed to the commodification of nature and its resources.

— Bali Principles of Climate Justice, article 18, August 29, 2002

In 2004, the Durban Group for Climate Justice was formed at an international meeting in Durban, South Africa. Here representatives from NGOs and peoples' movements discussed realistic policies for addressing climate change.

In 2007 at the 13th Conference of the Parties (COP 13) in Bali, the global coalition Climate Justice Now! was founded, and, in 2008, the Global Humanitarian Forum focused on climate justice at its inaugural meeting in Geneva.

In 2009, the Climate Justice Action Network was formed during the run-up to the Copenhagen Summit. It proposed civil disobedience and direct action during the summit, and many climate activists used the slogan 'system change not climate change'.

In April 2010, the World People's Conference on Climate Change and the Rights of Mother Earth took place in Tiquipaya, Bolivia. It was hosted by the government of Bolivia as a global gathering of civil society and governments. The conference published a "People's Agreement" calling, among other things, for greater climate justice.

In September 2013 the Climate Justice Dialogue convened by the Mary Robinson Foundation and the World Resources Institute released their Declaration on Climate Justice in an appeal to those drafting the proposed agreement to be negotiated at COP-21 in Paris in 2015.

In December 2018, the People's Demands for Climate Justice, signed by 292,000 individuals and 366 organizations, called upon government delegates at COP24 to comply with a list of six climate justice demands. One of the demands was to "Ensure developed countries honor their "Fair Shares" for largely fueling this crisis."

Some advance was achieved at the Paris climate finance summit at June 2023. The World Bank allowed to low income countries temporarily stop paying debts if they are hit by climate disaster. Most of financial help to climate vulnerable countries is coming in the form of debts, what often worsens the situation as those countries are overburdened with debts. Around 300 billion dollars was pledged as financial help in the next years, but trillions are needed to really solve the problem. More than 100 leading economists signed a letter calling for an extreme wealth tax as a solution (2% tax can generate around 2.5 trillion). It can serve as a loss and damage mechanism as the 1% of richest people is responsible for twice as many emissions as the poorest 50%.

== Examples ==
=== Subsistence farmers in Latin America ===
Several studies that investigated the impacts of climate change on agriculture in Latin America suggest that in the poorer countries of Latin America, agriculture composes the most important economic sector and the primary form of sustenance for small farmers. Maize is the only grain still produced as a sustenance crop on small farms in Latin American nations. The projected decrease of this grain and other crops can threaten the welfare and the economic development of subsistence communities in Latin America. Food security is of particular concern to rural areas that have weak or non-existent food markets to rely on in the case food shortages. In August 2019, Honduras declared a state of emergency when a drought caused the southern part of the country to lose 72% of its corn and 75% of its beans. Food security issues are expected to worsen across Central America due to climate change. It is predicted that by 2070, corn yields in Central America may fall by 10%, beans by 29%, and rice by 14%. With Central American crop consumption dominated by corn (70%), beans (25%), and rice (6%), the expected drop in staple crop yields could have devastating consequences.

The expected impacts of climate change on subsistence farmers in Latin America and other developing regions are unjust for two reasons. First, subsistence farmers in developing countries, including those in Latin America are disproportionately vulnerable to climate change Second, these nations were the least responsible for causing the problem of anthropogenic induced climate.

Disproportionate vulnerability to climate disasters is socially determined. For example, socioeconomic and policy trends affecting smallholder and subsistence farmers limit their capacity to adapt to change. A history of policies and economic dynamics has negatively impacted rural farmers. During the 1950s and through the 1980s, high inflation and appreciated real exchange rates reduced the value of agricultural exports. As a result, farmers in Latin America received lower prices for their products compared to world market prices. Following these outcomes, Latin American policies and national crop programs aimed to stimulate agricultural intensification. These national crop programs benefitted larger commercial farmers more. In the 1980s and 1990s low world market prices for cereals and livestock resulted in decreased agricultural growth and increased rural poverty.

Perceived vulnerability to climate change differs even within communities, as in the example of subsistence farmers in Calakmul, Mexico.

Adaptive planning is challenged by the difficulty of predicting local scale climate change impacts. A crucial component to adaptation should include government efforts to lessen the effects of food shortages and famines. Planning for equitable adaptation and agricultural sustainability will require the engagement of farmers in decision-making processes.

=== Hurricane Katrina ===
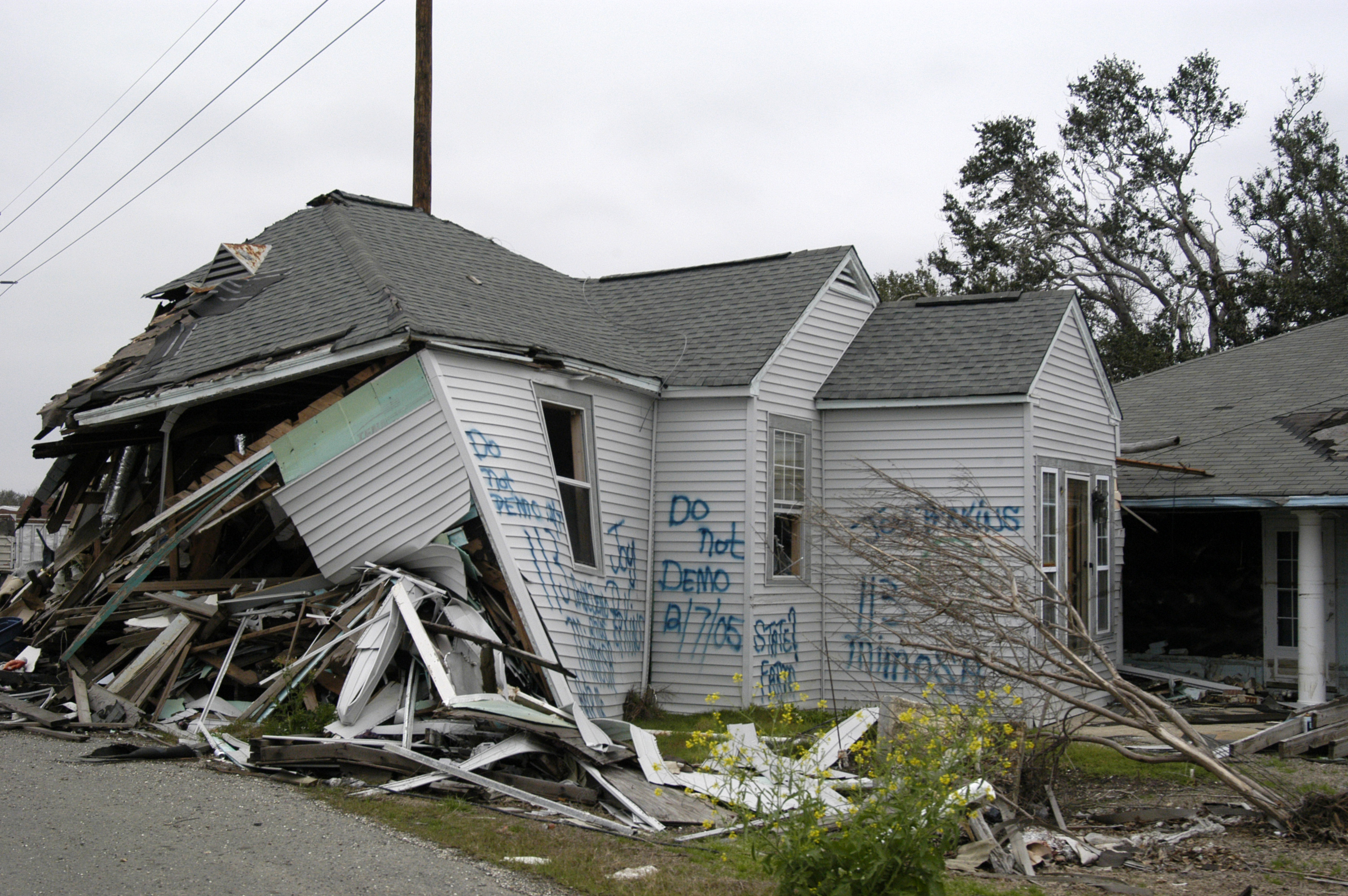
A house is crushed and swept off its foundations by flooding from a breached levee in the Ninth Ward, New Orleans, Louisiana, due to a storm surge from Hurricane Katrina. Around 90% of the Ninth Ward's population is black.

Due to climate change, tropical cyclones are expected to increase in intensity, have increased rainfall, and have larger storm surges. These changes are driven by rising sea temperatures and increased maximum water vapor content of the atmosphere as the air heats up.

Hurricane Katrina hit New Orleans, Louisiana on August 23 to August 31, 2005. Government officials, meteorologists and historical records have concluded that Hurricane Katrina is seen to be one of the most devastating natural disasters in United States history. The effects of the hurricane had lasting impacts on the city as well as New Orleans citizens. Hurricane Katrina is a prime example of how climate change disasters affect different people individually, as it had a disproportionate effect on low-income and minority groups.

Before the hurricane hit, New Orleans citizens were told to evacuate. People attempted to evacuate though any means possible. Some people left via car, bus or plane. Others used bikes and attempted to walk away from the city. However, many people lacked the financial resources to pack up and leave their home. While others did not have the physical capabilities to leave. Forcing people to stay in New Orleans. A study on the race and class dimensions of Hurricane Katrina suggests that those most vulnerable include poor, black, brown, elderly, sick, and homeless people. Low-income and black communities had little resources and limited mobility to evacuate before the storm. After the hurricane, these communities were most affected by contamination. This was made worse by the fact that government relief measures failed to adequately assist those most at risk. Meteorologists knew that New Orleans was susceptible to flooding, but government officials ignored the risks.

=== Pakistan Floods ===
In 2022, Pakistan faced catastrophic floods that affected over 33 million people and resulted in significant loss of life and property. The unprecedented monsoon rains and melting glaciers, attributed to climate change, submerged one-third of the country under water. The monsoon rains “saw record highs, receiving over 190% of its normal rainfall in July and August.” Despite contributing less than 1% to global greenhouse gas emissions, Pakistan is disproportionately impacted by climate-induced disasters. This situation highlights the essence of climate justice, emphasizing how nations with minimal contributions to global emissions suffer the most severe consequences.

Pakistan is considered to be a developing country and the country’s economic status plays a role in how the government operates. Unlike developed countries, Pakistan does not have access to the proper resources it needs to aid citizens when a large natural disaster occurs. Since 2021, Pakistan’s government has been facing an economic crisis with high inflation rates, low productivity and political instability. In 2025, monsoon rains killed about 800 people by June. The government has failed to communicate with its citizens about when a natural disaster or weather event will occur. The government was able to provide some aid by sending out ambulances, medicines and excavators to the Swabi district of Khyber Pakhtunkhwa. However, the floods were so detrimental that the vehicles were not able to even enter the community. Villagers were forced to use their hands to remove debris to recover dead bodies.

=== Chlordecone use in the French Antilles ===
In the French Antilles region of the Caribbean, the islands Martinique and Guadeloupe have faced injustice issues. The islands are heavily contaminated with chlordecone, following years of its massive unrestricted use. Chlordecone, commonly known as Kepone, is a synthetic organochlorine pesticide used for controlling insects on crops. In the 1970’s Chlordecone was banned in the United States. However, from 1972 to 1993, Chlordecone was heavily used in Martinique and Guadeloupe to combat an insect infestation in banana plantations. Chlordecone was banned globally by the Stockholm Convention on Persistent Organic Pollutants in 2009. Since 2003, local authorities in the two islands have restricted the cultivation of various food crops because the soil is badly contaminated by chlordecone.

In 2014 a study conducted ANSES and Santé Publique France estimated that 90% of inhabitants of the French Antilles had chlordecone in their blood. It wasn’t until 2021, when the French government added prostate cancer to the list of occupational diseases linked to pesticide exposure. It is seen that the highest rates of prostate cancer are found in people that live in the French Antilles. Along with the lasting health effects, Chlordecone is found in the soil and water on the islands. Scientists have found that chlordecone can contaminate soil for up to 600 years.

== See also ==
- Climate debt
- Environmental racism
- Global justice movement
- Greenhouse Development Rights
- International law
- Urban forest inequity
- Climate of the United States
- National Oceanic and Atmospheric Administration
