= Sumak kawsay =

Quechua neologism invented in the 1990s

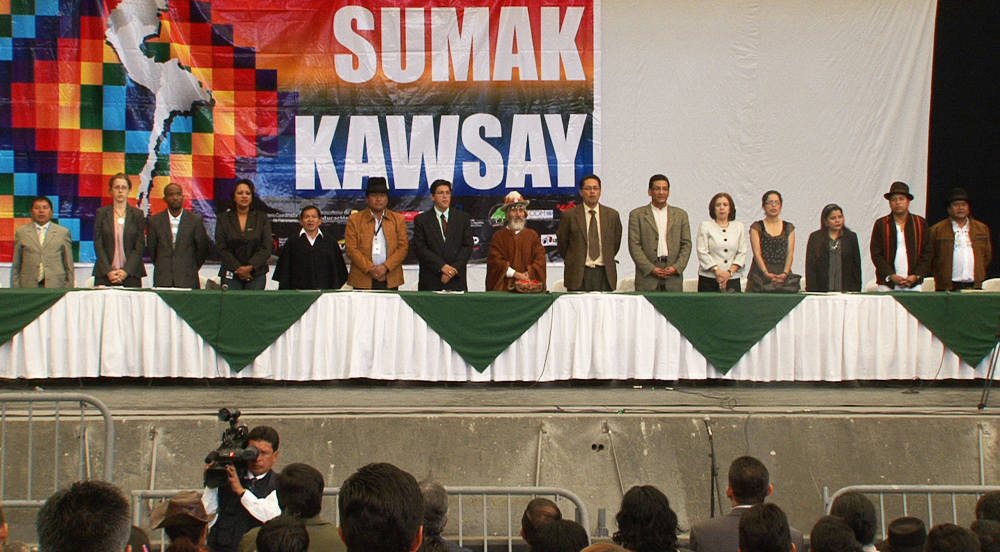
First Meeting of the Andean Peoples and Nationalities for Sumak Kawsay

Sumak kawsay is a neologism in Quechua created in the 1990s by socialist Indigenous organizations. Originally created as a political and cultural proposal, Ecuadorian and Bolivian governments later adopted it in their constitutions. The term refers to the implementation of a socialism that moves away from Western socialist theory and instead embraces the ancestral, communitarian knowledge and lifestyle of Quechua people. In Ecuador, it has been translated as buen vivir or "good living", although experts in the Quechua language agree that a more precise translation would be "the plentiful life". In Bolivia, the original term in Aymara is suma qamaña, which has been translated as vivir bien or living well.

In the original Quechua phrase, sumak refers to the ideal and beautiful fulfillment of the planet, and kawsay means "life," a life with dignity, plenitude, balance, and harmony. Similar ideas exist in other indigenous communities, such as the Mapuche (Chile), the Guaraní (Bolivia and Paraguay), the Achuar (Ecuadorian Amazon), the Guna (Panamá).

The Maya Tsotsil and Tseltal peoples pursue Lekil Kuxlejal (a fair-dignified life), which is considered equivalent to buen vivir and has influenced the development Neozapatismo.

Since the 1990s, sumak kawsay has grown into a political project that aims to achieve collective wellbeing, social responsibility in how people relate to nature, and a halt to endless capital accumulation. This final aspect makes the project an alternative to traditional development. Buen vivir proposes the collective realization of a harmonious and balanced life based on ethical values, in place of a development model that views human beings as an economic resource. Indigenous movements in Ecuador and Bolivia, along with intellectuals, initially used the concept to define an alternative paradigm to capitalist development with cosmological, holistic, and political dimensions. The 2008 Constitution of Ecuador incorporated the concept of the rights of nature, as did the 2009 Constitution of Bolivia. Diverse theorists, such as economists Alberto Acosta and Magdalena León, say that sumak kawsay is not about a finished and completely structured theory, but rather an unfinished social proposal that can be improved.

== Principles of sumak kawsay ==
The Andean philosopher Javier Lajo understands sumak kawsay as thinking well and feeling well in order to do well, with the ultimate goal of achieving harmony with the community, family, Nature, and universe. The ancestral sumak kawsay considers people as part of the Pachamama or Mother Earth. Unlike other paradigms, the modern buen vivir, inspired by indigenous traditions, looks for balance with Nature in the fulfillment of needs instead of mere economic growth.

Sumak kawsay is a paradigm based on five pillars:

1. There is no life without knowledge or wisdom (Tucu Yachay)
2. We all come from Mother Earth (Pacha Mama)
3. Life is healthy (hambi kawsay)
4. Life is collective (sumak kamaña)
5. We all have an aspiration or a dream (Hatun Muskuy)

Sumak kawsay, in the Andean conception, is the balance between feeling well (Allin Munay) and thinking well (Allin Yachay) which results in doing well (Allin Ruay) in order to achieve harmony, as explained by Lajo.

This principle, rooted in the Andean indigenous cosmovision and ancestral knowledge in general, is based on:

- Relationality, which refers to the interconnection among all elements in a whole
- Reciprocity, which has to do with the reciprocal relationship between the worlds above, below, now, between human beings and nature, a sort of co-participation
- Connection, which refers to how the elements of reality connect to each in a harmonious, proportional way

Sumak kawsay, living well, or splendid existence clashes with the idea of infinite progress. Pachamama or Mother Nature has a limit, which prevents unlimited development and growth at the cost of "the other"—nature, which includes human beings. Having a harmonious relationship requires re-knowing and applying complementarity and cooperation, not accumulation.

Sumak kawsay contemplates a harmonious relationship with society, which is understood as a wide, globalized sphere, and the field of the dominant culture and system. With this, the concept seeks to recreate and apply interculturality and plurinationality, fundamental precepts to this proposed way of life.

== History ==
Researchers say it is difficult to trace the concept's use, but many agree that the theoretical and political proposal gained traction in the 1990s. In Ecuador, Indigenous movements emerged in full force and created a series of internal, educational initiatives and international cooperation programs that promoted the principles of good living. In Bolivia, suma qamaña appeared because of the work of indigenous movements and intellectual, leftist groups.

According to the sociologist Guadalupe Rivadeneira, the concept of sumak kawsay has always existed. However, Amazonian Kichwas with the Pastaza Indigenous Peoples' Organization (OPIP) recently systematized the concept in 1994.

== Definitions ==
As a pluralistic concept, buen vivir has a variety of definitions. Eduardo Gudynas outlines eight core ideas for the concept: 1) create space for sharing critiques of development, 2) uplift ethical outlooks grounded in values, 3) center decolonization, 4) foster intercultural dialogue, 5) deny the nature–society binary, 6) reject manipulative and instrumental rationalities, 7) reject linear understanding of progress and 8) express feelings and affections. Overall, Gudynas endorses buen vivir as a framework for moving beyond modernity and development.

David Choquehuanca explains:

En esta línea se inserta en concepto del Buen Vivir, que se puede resumir en vivir en armonía con los demás seres humanos y la naturaleza, sobre la base de la unidad, la solidaridad y la empatía, retomando los principios ancestrales de los pueblos de la región. Esta mirada no es antropocéntrica y ni siquiera egocéntrica: formamos parte de la misma unidad y así como "nosotros somos montañas que caminan, los árboles son nuestros hermanos", según Choquehuanca. Del mismo modo, el Buen Vivir es buscar la vida en comunidad, donde todos los integrantes se preocupan por todos. Lo más importante es la vida en un sentido amplio, no el individuo ni la propiedad. Tal cosmovisión en búsqueda de la armonía exige, como es obvio, la renuncia a todo tipo de acumulación

— David Choquehuanca

English translation: In this context, the concept of Buen Vivir is introduced, which can be summarized as living in harmony with other human beings and nature, based on unity, solidarity, and empathy, drawing from the ancestral principles of the peoples of the region. This perspective is neither anthropocentric nor egocentric: we are part of the same unity, and just as "we are mountains that walk, trees are our brothers," according to Choquehuanca. Similarly, Buen Vivir is about seeking life in community, where all members care for one another. The most important thing is life in a broad sense, not the individual or property. Such a worldview in search of harmony requires, obviously, the renunciation of all forms of accumulation.

Luis Macas, Quechua lawyer and ex-president of CONAIE, wrote:

…el Sumak, es la plenitud, lo sublime, excelente magnífico, hermoso(a), superior. Kawsay, es la vida, es ser estando. Pero es dinámico, cambiante, no es una cuestión pasiva. Por lo tanto el sumak kawsay sería la vida en plenitud. La vida en excelencia material y espiritual. (...) Para los Pueblos Indígenas o las Naciones Originarias, este concepto es producto de todo un acumulado histórico milenario, proviene desde su vivencia de hace miles de años, así como de las experiencias de lucha de resistencia de nuestras Naciones. Por lo tanto, este concepto no aparece de la casualidad, ni nace en la Constitución de la República Ecuatoriana, el Sumak Kawsay, se origina en el centro de la vida comunitaria, es la esencia del sistema de vida comunitaria y se explica en el ejercicio y práctica cotidiana de nuestras comunidades, es lo vital de la matriz civilizatoria de nuestros Pueblos, que aún tiene vigencia, a pesar de la interrupción violenta de la colonialidad y la agresión del modelo capitalista.

— Luis Macas

English translation: …Sumak is plenitude, the sublime, excellent, magnificent, beautiful, superior. Kawsay is life, it is being. But it is dynamic, changing, it is not a passive matter. Therefore, sumak kawsay would be life in plenitude. Life in material and spiritual excellence. (...) For Indigenous Peoples or Original Nations, this concept is the product of a millennial historical accumulation, coming from their experiences thousands of years ago, as well as from the experiences of resistance struggles of our Nations. Therefore, this concept does not appear by chance, nor is it born in the Constitution of the Republic of Ecuador. Sumak Kawsay originates in the heart of community life, it is the essence of the community life system and is explained in the daily exercise and practice of our communities. It is the vital element of the civilizational matrix of our Peoples, which still remains relevant despite the violent interruption of coloniality and the aggression of the capitalist model.

== See also ==
- Indigenous peoples in Bolivia
- Indigenous peoples in Ecuador
- Law of the Rights of Mother Earth, passed in Bolivia in 2010
- Quechua people
