= Climate Justice Now! =

Coalition founded in 2007

Climate Justice Now! (CJN!) is a global coalition of networks and organizations campaigning for climate justice.

The coalition was founded at the 2007 UNFCCC meeting in Bali, and has since mobilised for UNFCCC meetings in Bangkok, Copenhagen and Cancun.

== Members ==
CJN! lists its members and allies on its website as:

- Asia Pacific Forum on Women, Law and Development (APWLD)
- Carbon Trade Watch
- Center for Environmental Concerns
- Centre for Environmental Justice, Sri Lanka
- Canadian Youth Climate Coalition/Coalition canadienne des jeunes pour le climat
- Earth in Brackets
- Earth Peoples
- Ecologistas en Acción
- Ecological Alert and Recovery-Thailand (EARTH)
- Focus on the Global South
- Freedom from Debt Coalition, Philippines
- Friends of the Earth International
- Friends of the Earth U.S.
- GAIA: Global Anti-Incinerator Alliance and Global Alliance for Incinerator Alternatives
- Global Exchange
- Global Forest Coalition
- Global Justice Ecology Project
- Gendercc – Women for Climate Justice
- IBONinternational
- Institute for Agriculture and Trade Policy (IATP)
- Institute for Policy Studies (IPS)
- International Forum on Globalization
- Kalikasan-Peoples Network for the Environment (Kalikasan-PNE)
- La Via Campesina International Peasant Movement
- Members of the Durban Group for Climate Justice
- Oilwatch
- Pacific Indigenous Peoples Environment Coalition, Aotearoa/New Zealand
- Sustainable Energy and Economy Network
- The Indigenous Environmental Network
- The International Institute of Climate Action & Theory
- The People's Coalition for Fisheries Justice-Indonesia (KIARA)
- Thai Working Group for Climate Justice (TCJ)
- Tibet Justice Center
- Timberwatch Coalition
- The Global Alliance of Indigenous Peoples and Local Communities against REDD
- WALHI/Friends of the Earth Indonesia
- World Rainforest Movement
- Quaker Earthcare Witness
