= Climate debt =

Climate change debt concept

Climate debt is the debt said to be owed to developing countries by developed countries for the damage caused by their disproportionately large contributions to climate change. Historical global greenhouse gas emissions, largely by developed countries, pose significant threats to developing countries, who are less able to deal with climate change's negative effects. Therefore, some consider developed countries to owe a debt to developing ones for their disproportionate contributions to climate change.

The concept of climate debt is part of the broader concept of ecological debt. It has received increased attention since its submission to the 2009 United Nations Climate Change Conference, where developing countries, led by Bolivia, sought the repayment of climate debt.

The main components of climate debt are adaptation debt and emissions debt. Adaptation debt is claimed to be owed by developed countries to developing countries to assist them in their adaptation to climate change. Emissions debt is claimed to be owed by developed countries for their disproportionate amount of greenhouse gas emissions.

Since the introduction of the concept of climate debt, there has been an on-going debate about the proper interpretation of climate debt. Developed countries and developing countries, as well as independent stakeholders, have taken a variety of stands on the issue.

== History ==
The concept of climate debt was first introduced in the 1990s by non-governmental organizations. Advocates of climate debt claimed that the Global North owes the Global South a debt for their contributions to climate change. Support from nations soon followed. Beyond financial compensation, climate debt also reflects the legacies of colonial extraction that enabled industrialized nations to accumulate wealth through the exploitation of land, labor and natural resources in the Global South. These historical hierarchies persist through modern carbon markets and global adaptation regimes, producing what has been described as a form of climate colonialism in which developing and Indigenous communities endure disproportionate ecological and social burdens of a crisis they contributed to the least.During the Group of 77 South Summit in Havana in 2000, developing countries advocated the recognition of the climate debt owed by the Global North as the basis of solutions to climate issues. However, the concept of climate debt was not explicitly defined at the UNFCCC.

At the 2009 United Nations Climate Change Conference, countries including Bolivia, Venezuela, Sudan, and Tuvalu refused the adoption of the Copenhagen Accord, stating that industrialized countries did not want to take responsibility for climate change. At the conference, Bolivia, Cuba, Dominica, Honduras, Nicaragua, and Venezuela made a proposal that evaluated developed countries' historical climate debt to developing countries. The proposal analyzed the cause of climate change and explained adaptation debt and emissions debt.

In 2010, Bolivia and other developing countries hosted the World People's Conference on Climate Change and the Rights of Mother Earth and reached the People's Agreement, which states:

We, the people attending the World People’s Conference on Climate Change and the Rights of Mother Earth in Cochabamba, Bolivia, demand to the countries that have over-consumed the atmospheric space to acknowledge their historic and current responsibilities for the causes and adverse effects of climate change, and to honor their climate debts to developing countries, to vulnerable communities in their own countries, to our children’s children and to all living beings in our shared home – Mother Earth.

The People's Agreement states that climate debt is owed by not only financial compensation but also restorative justice. It clearly rejected the Copenhagen Accord.

Apart from official agreements between nations, climate debt has been appearing in public media with both supporters and opponents.

== Adaptation debt ==
Adaptation debt is the compensation that developing countries claim they are owed due to the damage they feel from the environmental effects of the developed world. This is based on the idea that poorer nations face the most damaging consequences of climate change, for which they had little contribution.

Scientists and researchers cite that as a result of the rising sea levels that are spurred by the emissions from the developed world, people of poorer countries suffer an increasing amount of natural disasters and economic damages. This environmental destruction harms the economy and livelihood of the people in poorer nations.

Disasters from climate change disproportionately affect poorer and tropical regions and have caused the majority of disasters and trillions of dollars' worth of economic losses since around the start of the 21st century. Poorer countries also lack the necessary infrastructure, development, and capital to be able to bounce back from a disaster, forcing them to borrow money at higher interests to aid their recovery from the destruction. This in turn worsens the opportunities, development, and life quality of those living in poorer regions.

Adaptation debt aims to have rich countries adopt the responsibility of helping developing nations that have suffered the negative environmental effects of their industrialization and carbon emissions. As noted in the UNFCCC, this can be done through providing financial assistance to affected countries and also through spending resources in aiding poorer countries to better cope with natural disasters.

== Emission debt ==
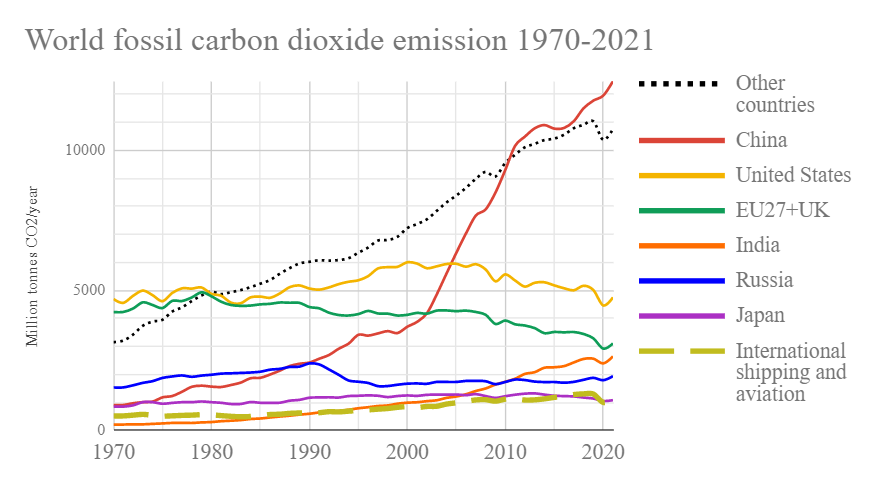
World fossil carbon dioxide emissions of six top countries and confederations

Emissions debt is a debt owed by developed countries based upon their majority contribution of greenhouse gases in the atmosphere, despite having relatively lower populations. Because of their contributions, the amount of carbon emissions that the Earth can currently absorb is lower.

The capacity to absorb emissions by the environment is termed as the total carbon space; the emissions debt concept argues that developed countries have overused their fair allocation of this space. As a result, there is not enough carbon space left for poorer countries to release emissions during their industrialization process, placing a burden on their development and survival.

Data shows that since around 1750, the United States alone has contributed to 25% of all carbon emissions and developed countries in total have contributed to 70% of all emissions. It is estimated that the average American may owe up to $12000 in emissions debt for carbon emissions between 1970 and 2013.

To repay the emissions debt, developed countries would need to help developing countries industrialize in ways that reduce the strain on the environment and keep climate change in check. They would also need to lead efforts in reducing global carbon emissions. Emissions debt also calls for a redistribution of the carbon space among the developed and developing nations and aims to allocate the carbon space in accordance with the population of each country.

In November 2014, the G20 nations vowed support and financial contributions to the Green Climate Fund, which aims to assist developing nations in reducing the emissions of their development and economic processes. It will also help them adapt to the consequences of climate change. The target of this initiative is to contribute $100 billion to the Green Climate Fund every year starting in 2020.

== Political discourse ==
Support for climate debt generally comes from developing countries and environmentalist NGOs, with criticisms of climate debt usually coming from developed nations. Independent analysts hold a variety of views on the matter, both supporting and criticizing the idea.

=== Support ===
Support for the implementation of a climate debt framework is led by developing countries that have and will continue to feel severe negative impacts due to climate change. Other primary supporters outside of the global south include various environmental NGOs and climate justice movements in the developed world.

In a formal presentation of the idea of climate debt at the Copenhagen conference, Bolivia provided evidence that their nation has been negatively affected by climate change in the form of threatened water supplies from glacial retreat, drought, floods, and negative economic impacts. This was complemented with data showing that developed countries have contributed far more to climate change than developing countries, with the latter being most at risk of its negative effects. This evidence was used to support the argument that developed countries owe a climate debt to developing countries that must be repaid in the form of reduced emissions as agreed upon in the Copenhagen Accord. Further support was provided with the assertion that developing countries have a right to their share of environmental space that developed countries have encroached upon with their excessive emissions, and that the repayment of the climate debt is a means to achieving this space.

The earliest group of nations to propose the ideas that would become the foundation of the climate debt argument was the Alliance of Small Island States. Most of the Least Developed Countries were early to support these ideas as well.

=== Criticism ===
Criticisms of the idea of climate debt are purported by developed countries and some independent political analysts. Developed nations are generally negatively predisposed to the concept of climate debt because under such a framework they would need to quickly curtail emissions and provide significant financial support to developing countries.

Commonly, criticisms attempt to invalidate the idea that a debt is owed from developed countries to developing countries as compensation for historical emissions and ecological damage. Arguments used to support this claim include the following: although countries are responsible for the emissions they have made, they should not bear the guilt or owe debts; the negative effects of carbon emissions were not understood until recently, and therefore any emissions made before this understanding should not be a source of guilt; countries should not bear the guilt for the actions of their ancestors, over which the current generation had no control. Statements that align with these arguments were made by the United States' chief climate negotiator, Todd Stern, at the 2009 Copenhagen conference.

One criticism is that the foundational principles of a political climate debt framework are not based on science. Analyst Olivier Godard claims that the idea of a climate debt requires a priori judgment decisions to be made about debt, responsibility, and their place in international relations. These preemptive judgments invalidate the idea because they over-simplify complex ethical, historical, and political realities.

Another criticism is that climate debt is based on the egalitarian view that the atmosphere is a global commons, a view that is applied to a few other finite resources. This climate-centric view disregards all the credit that should be owed to developed countries for their positive contributions to the world, such as the inventions of governments, philosophies, and technologies that have benefitted the entire world.

Many critics have claimed that, although the concept of climate debt may be ethically sound, it may actually undermine political negotiations regarding climate change due to its "adversarial" basis, and negotiations should instead use a different framework.

In response to some of these criticisms, supporters of climate debt claim that critics are few in number, and that the majority of political analysts are in support of enforcing climate debt.

== See also ==
- Paris Agreement
- Copenhagen Accord
- Kyoto Protocol
