= Andrew Simms =

British environmentalist and political economist

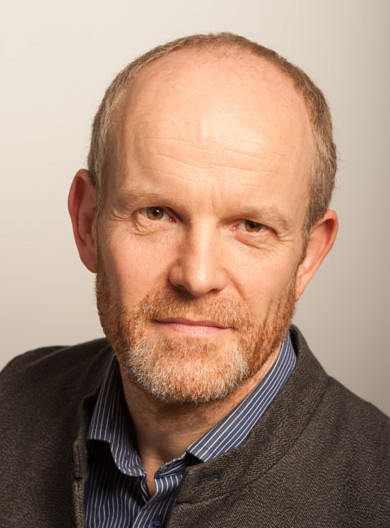

Academic background
- Education: London School of Economics

Academic work
- Discipline: political economy
- Institutions: New Weather Institute; University of Sussex
- Main interests: ecological debt

Andrew Simms is an author, analyst and co-director of the New Weather Institute. He is a research associate with the Centre for Global Political Economy at the University of Sussex and Fellow at the New Economics Foundation.

Andrew Simms advocates the notion of ecological debt as an illustration of the degree to which economies operate beyond environmental thresholds, and initiated the annual marking of the day when the world is estimated to enter 'overshoot'.

== Career ==
Andrew Simms also served as Policy Director for ten years, Communications Director, and established the Climate Change Programme for the foundation. He co-authored The Green New Deal and co-founded the Green New Deal Group, the climate campaign onehundredmonths.org and cooperative think tank the New Weather Institute. He was a Principal Speaker of the Green Party.

A political economist and environmentalist, Simms studied at the London School of Economics for a master's degree in development and international political economy, and has written a number of reports on climate change, globalisation and localisation, development issues, debt (conventional and ecological debt), finance and banking, corporate accountability, genetic engineering and food security. He coined the term 'clone towns' to describe the economic and homogenising effects of chain retailers on town centres.

== Publications ==
Simms is the author of several books including:

- Ecological Debt: The Health of the Planet & the Wealth of Nations (2005, 2009) Pluto Press
- Tescopoly: How one shop came out on top and why it matters (2007)
- Do Good Lives Have to Cost the Earth? (co-author)(2008)
- The New Economics co-authored with David Boyle (2009) Routledge ISBN 978-1844076758
- Eminent Corporations: the Rise and Fall of the Great British Corporation (co-author)(2010)
- Cancel the Apocalypse: the New Path to Prosperity (2013) Little, Brown and Company
- Knock Twice: 25 Modern Folk Tales for Troubling Times (2017)
