= Global climate regime =

A global climate regime is a global framework that aims at regulating the interaction of human activity with the global climate system, to mitigate global climate change. The framework for such a regime was developed by the United Nations Framework Convention on Climate Change, or UNFCCC for short.

== History ==
After the adoption of the United Nations Framework Convention on Climate Change in 1992, which established the objective of avoiding dangerous human interference with the global climate system, governments' negotiation efforts have focused on operationalizing this goal. The first legally binding result has been the Kyoto Protocol which was agreed upon in 1997 and came into force in 2005, with its First Commitment Period in effect from 2008 to 2012. The 2009 deadline for reaching a post-Kyoto agreement, established at COP13 in Bali in 2007 was missed, and since the end of 2012, the voluntary emissions reductions commitments from the Copenhagen Accord have become the de facto global climate regime.

In 2015, the Paris Agreement was signed, cementing its place as the global climate regime. It requires countries to submit Nationally determined contributions in the form of plans to reduce emissions, and update their plans every five years at a global stocktake. Under the Paris climate regime, all countries have signed on to the goal of net balance between sources and sinks of greenhouse gases in the second half of the 21st century. The goal is holding the increase in temperatures to "well below" 2 degrees Celsius, and "pursuing efforts to limit the temperature increase to 1.5°C above pre-industrial levels."

In 2021, at the 2021 United Nations Climate Change Conference, the Glasgow Climate Pact was signed, under which nations agreed to "phase down" the use of Coal and take other actions to enhance ambition and reduce emissions.

== Issues ==
Over the last century increasing concentrations of gasses such as carbon dioxide, methane and nitrous oxide have formed a blanket in the atmosphere, creating a greenhouse effect. The warming has brought about a number of significant issues. The Arctic ice is melting, which is causing an increase in the amount of heat retained at the Earth's poles. Deforestation, whether intentional or by wildfire, is affecting the natural filtration of the air. It is also decreasing the surface albedo of the land, raising global temperatures. Over the last decade many changes in weather patterns have been observed, such as more frequent unusually hot days and nights with less frequent unusually cold days and nights. Droughts have become more common in some areas, and a rainfall level increase in others.

== Proposals ==
Proposals for a global climate regime include:

- Contraction and Convergence
- Greenhouse Development Rights
- Cap and Share
- Nishimura's proposal of a global upstream carbon market
- WBGU's Budget Approach
- Kyoto2
- Earth Atmospheric Trust
- Global Climate Certificate System
