= Environmental space =

The concept of environmental space is the amount of any particular resource that can be consumed by a country without threatening the continued availability of that resource (sustainability), assuming that everyone in the world is entitled to an equal share.

The weakness of the concept is that it requires calculating the maximum sustainable consumption rate of each different resource globally. This rate could be set by either the maximum sustainable yield (say for forests or fisheries) or the assimilative capacity of the environment (e.g. for CO_{2} or chlorine), but both quantities are very difficult to determine, so the 'environmental space' has rather large error limits and is therefore hard to defend in policy discussions. A further difficulty is that there is a different 'environmental space' for each kind of resource, and as they each necessarily have different units of measure, they cannot be added to get an overall environmental space for all the resources consumed by a country. The idea of environmental space was promoted quite strongly by Friends of the Earth Europe in the mid-1990s, but it is rarely used now, because of the aforementioned difficulties, and has essentially been superseded by 'ecological footprint'. The advantage of the ecological footprint is that every kind of resource use is converted to a land area basis, so that they can be added to produce an overall figure for a country, allowing comparisons to be made.
