= Magdalena León Trujillo =

Economist from Ecuador

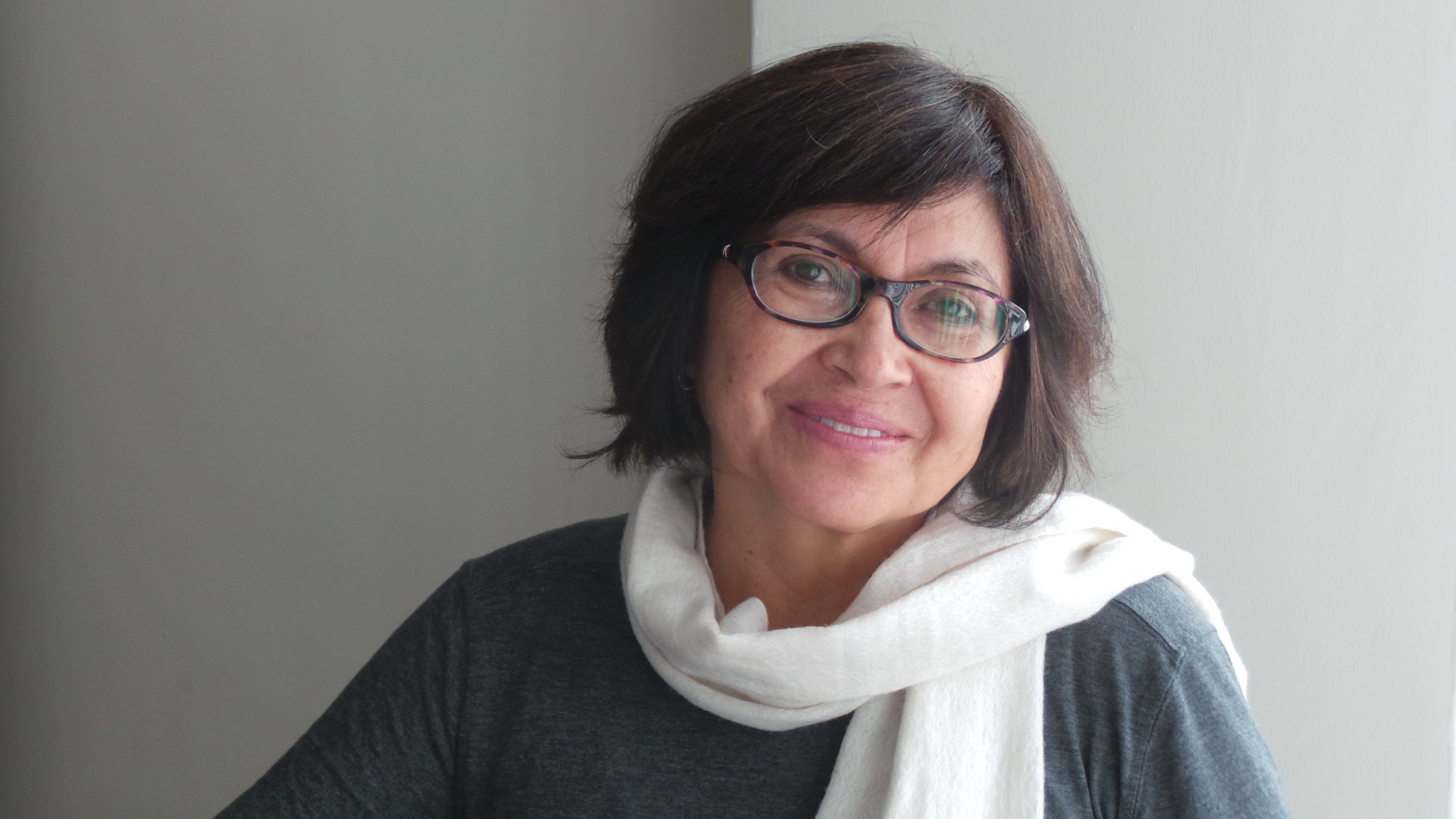
- Magdalena León Trujillo in 2015
- Born: Cayambe, Ecuador
- Education: Central University of Ecuador
- Occupations: Economist, feminist
- Website: www.magdalenaleont.net

Magdalena León Trujillo, commonly known as Magdalena León T (born 1959), is an Ecuadorian economist and researcher specializing in feminist economics, solidarity economy, and Sumak Kawsay as an alternative to traditional development and the economic implications therein.

== Education ==
León graduated from the Faculty of Economic Sciences of the Central University of Ecuador and a gender studies degree from the World University Service campus in Santiago, Chile.

== Career ==
She is the coordinator of the Network of Women Transforming the Economy (REMTE) and the National Group on the Debt of Ecuador, the Chairwoman of the Studies, Action, and Social Participation Foundation(FEDAEPS) and is a member of the organization "Feminism and Change in Latin America and the Caribbean." From 2009 to 2013, Trujillo was a member of the team that formulated the National Plan for Better Living in Ecuador.

She is the president and a researcher of the Foundation of Studies, Action and Social Participation (FEDAEPS), and the Coordinator of the Latin American Women Transforming the Economy Network (REMTE), of which she has been a member since its foundation in 1997. She is also a member of the Institute of Ecuadorian Studies, the workgroup Feminism and Social Change in Latin America, and the Caribbean and Latin American Council of Social Sciences (CLACSO). Trujillo also heads the Secretariat of the Hemispheric Council of the Americas Social Forum and the National Debt Group of Ecuador.

León T. worked with Ecuadorian President Rafael Correa on the debt audit carried out by his country in 2008 and on the constitutional process of the Ecuadorian State. He was part of the team that formulated the National Plan for Good Living 2009-2013.
