= Acción Ecológica =

Acción Ecológica is one of the main environmental organizations in Ecuador. It is based in Quito, and was founded by Ivonne Yánez.

It campaigns on a range of issues including oil extraction, exploration and pipeline transport, Amazon rainforest protection, food sovereignty, biofuels and plantations for carbon offsets.
