= Pierre Teilhard de Chardin =

French philosopher and Jesuit priest (1881–1955)

The Reverend Pierre Teilhard de Chardin S.J.
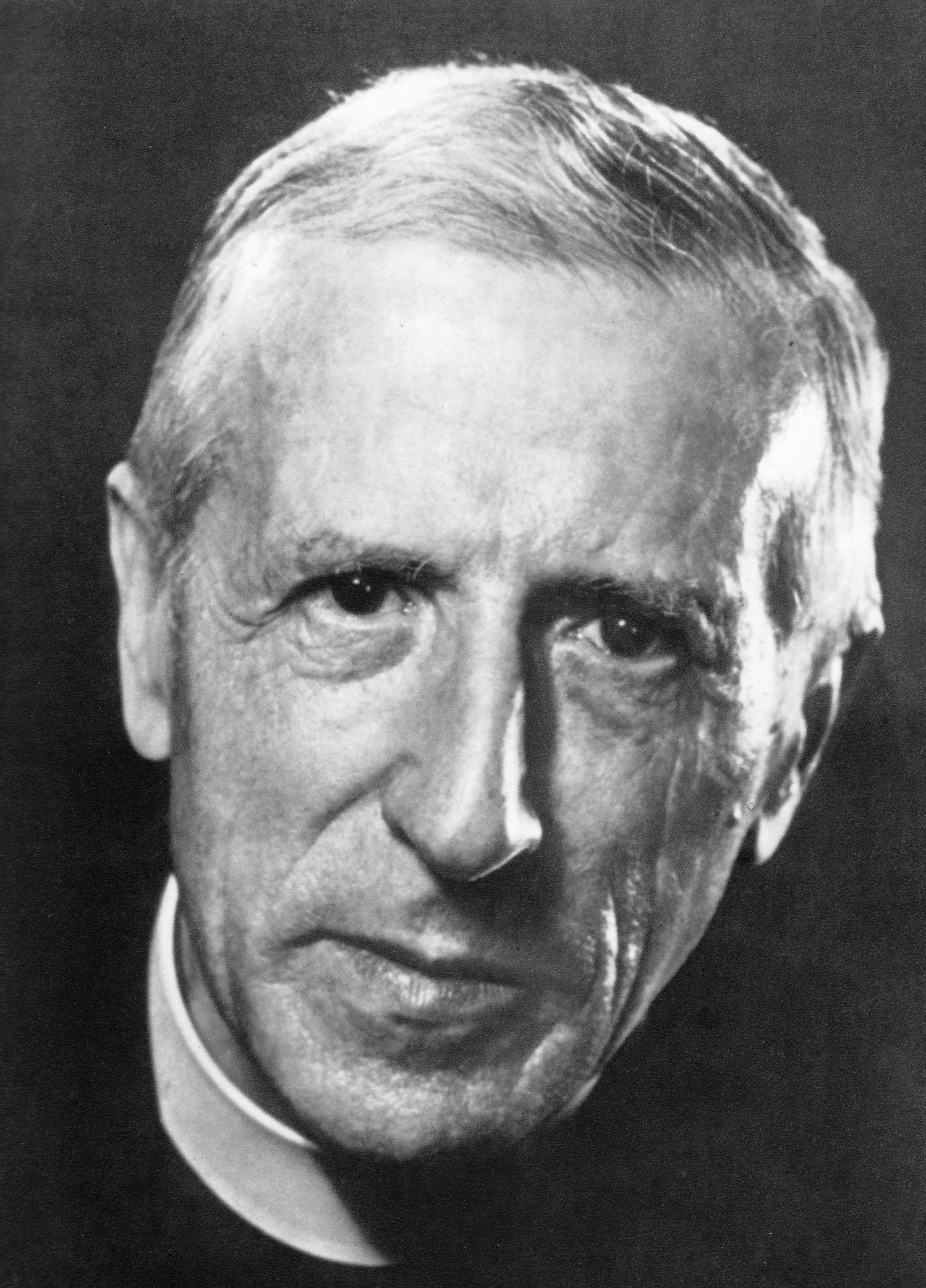
- Born: 1 May 1881; Orcines, Puy-de-Dôme, France
- Died: 10 April 1955 (aged 73); New York City, U.S.

Academic background
- Education: University of Paris
- Influences: Paul; John; Origen; Ignatius; John of the Cross; Darwin; Henri Bergson; Édouard Le Roy

Academic work
- Era: 20th-century philosophy
- Discipline: Western philosophy
- School or tradition: Christian philosophy
- Main interests: Philosophy of biology; philosophy of religion
- Notable works: The Phenomenon of Man (1955); The Divine Milieu (1957)
- Notable ideas: Omega Point; Noosphere
- Influenced: De Lubac; Berry; Huxley; Dobzhansky; Pope Benedict XVI; Pope Francis; Tipler; McLuhan; Ting; Swimme; Barlow

Pierre Teilhard de Chardin, S.J. (French: [pjɛʁ tɛjaʁ də ʃaʁdɛ̃]; 1 May 1881 – 10 April 1955) was a French Jesuit priest, scientist, paleontologist, philosopher, mystic and teacher. He investigated the theory of evolution from a perspective influenced by Henri Bergson and Christian mysticism, writing scientific and religious works on the subject. His mainstream scientific achievements include his paleontological research in China, taking part in the discovery of the significant Peking Man fossils from the Zhoukoudian cave complex, near Beijing.

His more speculative ideas, sometimes criticized as pseudoscientific, have included a vitalist conception of the Omega Point. Along with Vladimir Vernadsky, he contributed to the development of the concept of the noosphere. In 1962, the Holy Office issued a warning regarding Teilhard's works, alleging ambiguities and doctrinal errors without specifying them. Some eminent Catholic figures, including Pope Benedict XVI and Pope Francis, have made positive comments on some of his ideas since. The response to his writings by scientists has been divided. He received several citations, and was awarded the Médaille militaire and the Legion of Honour, the highest French order of merit, both military and civil.

== Life ==
=== Early years ===
Pierre Teilhard de Chardin was born in the Château of Sarcenat, Orcines, about 2.5 miles north-west of Clermont-Ferrand, Auvergne, French Third Republic, on 1 May 1881, as the fourth of eleven children of librarian Emmanuel Teilhard de Chardin (1844–1932) and Berthe-Adèle, née de Dompierre d'Hornoys of Picardy. His mother was a great-grandniece of the philosopher Voltaire. He inherited the double surname from his father, who was descended on the Teilhard side from an ancient family of magistrates from Auvergne originating in Murat, Cantal, ennobled under Louis XVIII.

His father, a graduate of the École Nationale des Chartes, served as a regional librarian and was a keen naturalist with a strong interest in natural science. He collected rocks, insects and plants and encouraged nature studies in the family. Pierre Teilhard's spirituality was awakened by his mother. When he was twelve, he went to the Jesuit college of Mongré in Villefranche-sur-Saône, where he completed the Baccalauréat in philosophy and mathematics. In 1899, he entered the Jesuit novitiate in Aix-en-Provence. In October 1900, he began his junior studies at the Collégiale Saint-Michel de Laval. On 25 March 1901, he made his first vows. In 1902, Teilhard completed a licentiate in literature at the University of Caen.

In 1901 and 1902, due to an anti-clerical movement in the French Republic, the government banned the Jesuits and other religious orders from France. This forced the Jesuits to go into exile on the island of Jersey in the United Kingdom. While there, his brother and sister in France died of illnesses and another sister was incapacitated by illness. The unexpected losses of his siblings at young ages caused Teilhard to plan to discontinue his Jesuit studies in science, and change to studying theology. He wrote that he changed his mind after his Jesuit novice master encouraged him to follow science as a legitimate way to God. Due to his strength in science subjects, he was despatched to teach physics and chemistry at the Collège de la Sainte Famille in Cairo, Khedivate of Egypt from 1905 until 1908. From there he wrote in a letter: "[I]t is the dazzling of the East foreseen and drunk greedily ... in its lights, its vegetation, its fauna and its deserts."

For the next four years he was a Scholastic at Ore Place in Hastings, East Sussex where he acquired his theological formation. There he synthesized his scientific, philosophical and theological knowledge in the light of evolution. At that time he read Creative Evolution by Henri Bergson, about which he wrote that "the only effect that brilliant book had upon me was to provide fuel at just the right moment, and very briefly, for a fire that was already consuming my heart and mind." Bergson was a French philosopher who was influential in the traditions of analytic philosophy and continental philosophy. His ideas were influential on Teilhard's views on matter, life, and energy. On 24 August 1911, aged 30, Teilhard was ordained a priest.

In the ensuing years, Bergson's protege, the mathematician and philosopher Édouard Le Roy, was appointed successor to Bergson at the College de France. In 1921, Le Roy and Teilhard became friends and met weekly for long discussions. Teilhard wrote: "I loved him like a father, and owed him a very great debt . . . he gave me confidence, enlarged my mind, and served as a spokesman for my ideas, then taking shape, on 'hominization' and the 'noosphere.'" Le Roy later wrote in one of his books: "I have so often and for so long talked over with Pierre Teilhard the views expressed here that neither of us can any longer pick out his own contribution."

== Academic and scientific career ==
=== Geology ===
His father's strong interest in natural science and geology instilled the same in Teilhard from an early age, and would continue throughout his lifetime. As a child, Teilhard was intensely interested in the stones and rocks on his family's land and the neighboring regions. His father helped him develop his skills of observation. At the University of Paris, he studied geology, botany and zoology. After the French government banned all religious orders from France and the Jesuits were exiled to the island of Jersey in the UK, Teilhard deepened his geology knowledge by studying the rocks and landscape of the island.

In 1920, he became a lecturer in geology at the Catholic University of Paris, and later a professor. He earned his doctorate in 1922. In 1923 he was hired to do geological research on expeditions in China by the Jesuit scientist and priest Emile Licent. In 1914, Licent with the sponsorship of the Jesuits founded one of the first museums in China and the first museum of natural science: the Musée Hoangho Paiho. In its first eight years, the museum was housed in the Chongde Hall of the Jesuits. In 1922, with the support of the Catholic Church and the French Concession, Licent built a special building for the museum on the land adjacent to the Tsin Ku University, which was founded by the Jesuits in China.

With help from Teilhard and others, Licent collected over 200,000 paleontology, animal, plant, ancient human, and rock specimens for the museum, which still make up more than half of its 380,000 specimens. Many of the publications and writings of the museum and its related institute were included in the world's database of zoological, botanical, and paleontological literature, which is still an important basis for examining the early scientific records of the various disciplines of biology in northern China.

Teilhard and Licent were the first to discover and examine the Shuidonggou (水洞沟) (Ordos Upland, Inner Mongolia) archaeological site in northern China. Recent analysis of flaked stone artifacts from the most recent (1980) excavation at this site has identified an assemblage which constitutes the southernmost occurrence of an Initial Upper Paleolithic blade technology proposed to have originated in the Altai region of Southern Siberia. The lowest levels of the site are now dated from 40,000 to 25,000 years ago.

Teilhard spent the periods between 1926-1935 and 1939-1945 studying and researching the geology and paleontology of the region. Among other accomplishments, he improved understanding of China's sedimentary deposits and established approximate ages for various layers. He also produced a geological map of China. It was during the period 1926-1935 that he joined the excavation that discovered Peking Man.

=== Paleontology ===
From 1912 to 1914, Teilhard began his paleontology education by working in the laboratory of the French National Museum of Natural History, studying the mammals of the middle Tertiary. Later he studied elsewhere in Europe. This included spending 5 days over the course of a 3-month period in the middle of 1913 as a volunteer assistant helping to dig with Arthur Smith Woodward and Charles Dawson at the Piltdown site. Teilhard's brief time assisting with digging there occurred many months after the discovery of the first fragments of the fraudulent "Piltdown Man". Stephen Jay Gould judged that Pierre Teilhard de Chardin conspired with Dawson in the Piltdown forgery. Most Teilhard experts (including all three Teilhard biographers) and many scientists (including the scientists who uncovered the hoax and investigated it) have rejected the suggestion that he participated in the hoax.

Anthropologist H. James Birx wrote that Teilhard "had questioned the validity of this fossil evidence from the very beginning, one positive result was that the young geologist and seminarian now became particularly interested in paleoanthropology as the science of fossil hominids." Marcellin Boule, a paleontologist and anthropologist, who as early as 1915 had recognized the non-hominid origins of the Piltdown finds, gradually guided Teilhard towards human paleontology. Boule was the editor of the journal L'Anthropologie and the founder of two other scientific journals. He was also a professor at the Parisian Muséum National d'Histoire Naturelle for 34 years, and for many years director of the museum's Institute of Human Paleontology.

It was there that Teilhard became a friend of Henri Breuil, a Catholic priest, archaeologist, anthropologist, ethnologist and geologist. In 1913, Teilhard and Breuil did excavations at the prehistoric painted Cave of El Castillo in Spain. The cave contains the oldest known cave painting in the world. The site is divided into about 19 archeological layers in a sequence beginning in the Proto-Aurignacian and ending in the Bronze Age.

Later after his return to China in 1926, Teilhard was hired by the Cenozoic Laboratory at the Peking Union Medical College. Starting in 1928, he joined other geologists and paleontologists to excavate the sedimentary layers in the Western Hills near Zhoukoudian. At this site, the scientists discovered the so-called Peking man (Sinanthropus pekinensis), a fossil hominid dating back at least 350,000 years, which is part of the Homo erectus phase of human evolution. Teilhard became well-known as a result of his accessible explanations of the Sinanthropus discovery. He also made major contributions to the geology of this site. Teilhard's long stay in China gave him more time to think and write about evolution, as well as continue his scientific research.

After the Peking Man discoveries, Breuil joined Teilhard at the site in 1931 and confirmed the presence of stone tools.

=== Scientific writings ===
During his career, Teilhard published many dozens of scientific papers in scholarly scientific journals. When they were published in collections as books, they took up 11 volumes. John Allen Grim, president of the American Teilhard Association and the co-founder and co-director of the Yale Forum on Religion and Ecology, said: "I think you have to distinguish between the hundreds of papers that Teilhard wrote in a purely scientific vein, about which there is no controversy. In fact, the papers made him one of the top two or three geologists of the Asian continent. So this man knew what science was. What he's doing in The Phenomenon and most of the popular essays that have made him controversial is working pretty much alone to try to synthesize what he's learned about through scientific discovery - more than with scientific method - what scientific discoveries tell us about the nature of ultimate reality." Grim said those writings were controversial to some scientists because Teilhard combined theology and metaphysics with science, and controversial to some religious leaders for the same reason.

=== Service in World War I ===
Mobilized in December 1914, Teilhard served in World War I as a stretcher-bearer in the 8th Moroccan Rifles. Priests were mobilized in the France of the First World War era, and not as military chaplains but as either stretcher-bearers or actual fighting soldiers. For his valor, he received several citations, including the Médaille militaire and the Legion of Honor.

During the war, he developed his reflections in his diaries and in letters to his cousin, Marguerite Teillard-Chambon, who later published a collection of them. (See section below) He later wrote: "...the war was a meeting... with the Absolute." In 1916, he wrote his first essay: La Vie Cosmique (Cosmic life), where his scientific and philosophical thought was revealed just as his mystical life. While on leave from the military he pronounced his solemn vows as a Jesuit in Sainte-Foy-lès-Lyon on 26 May 1918. In August 1919, in Jersey, he wrote Puissance spirituelle de la Matière (The Spiritual Power of Matter).

At the University of Paris, Teilhard pursued three unit degrees of natural science: geology, botany, and zoology. His thesis treated the mammals of the French lower Eocene and their stratigraphy. After 1920, he lectured in geology at the Catholic Institute of Paris and after earning a science doctorate in 1922 became an assistant professor there.

=== Research in China ===
In 1923 he traveled to China with Father Émile Licent, who was in charge of a significant laboratory collaboration between the National Museum of Natural History and Marcellin Boule's laboratory in Tianjin. Licent carried out considerable basic work in connection with Catholic missionaries who accumulated observations of a scientific nature in their spare time.

Teilhard wrote several essays, including La Messe sur le Monde (The Mass on the World), in the Ordos Desert. In the following year, he continued lecturing at the Catholic Institute and participated in a cycle of conferences for the students of the Engineers' Schools. Two theological essays on original sin were sent to a theologian at his request on a purely personal basis:

- Chute, Rédemption et Géocentrie (Fall, Redemption and Geocentry) (July 1920)
- Notes sur quelques représentations historiques possibles du Péché originel (Note on Some Possible Historical Representations of Original Sin) (Works, Tome X, Spring 1922)

The Church required him to give up his lecturing at the Catholic Institute in order to continue his geological research in China. Teilhard traveled again to China in April 1926. He would remain there for about twenty years, with many voyages throughout the world. He settled until 1932 in Tianjin with Émile Licent, then in Beijing. Teilhard made five geological research expeditions in China between 1926 and 1935. They enabled him to establish a general geological map of China.

In 1926–27, after a missed campaign in Gansu, Teilhard traveled in the Sanggan River Valley near Kalgan (Zhangjiakou) and made a tour in Eastern Mongolia. He wrote Le Milieu Divin (The Divine Milieu). Teilhard prepared the first pages of his main work Le Phénomène Humain (The Phenomenon of Man). The Holy See refused the Imprimatur for Le Milieu Divin in 1927.

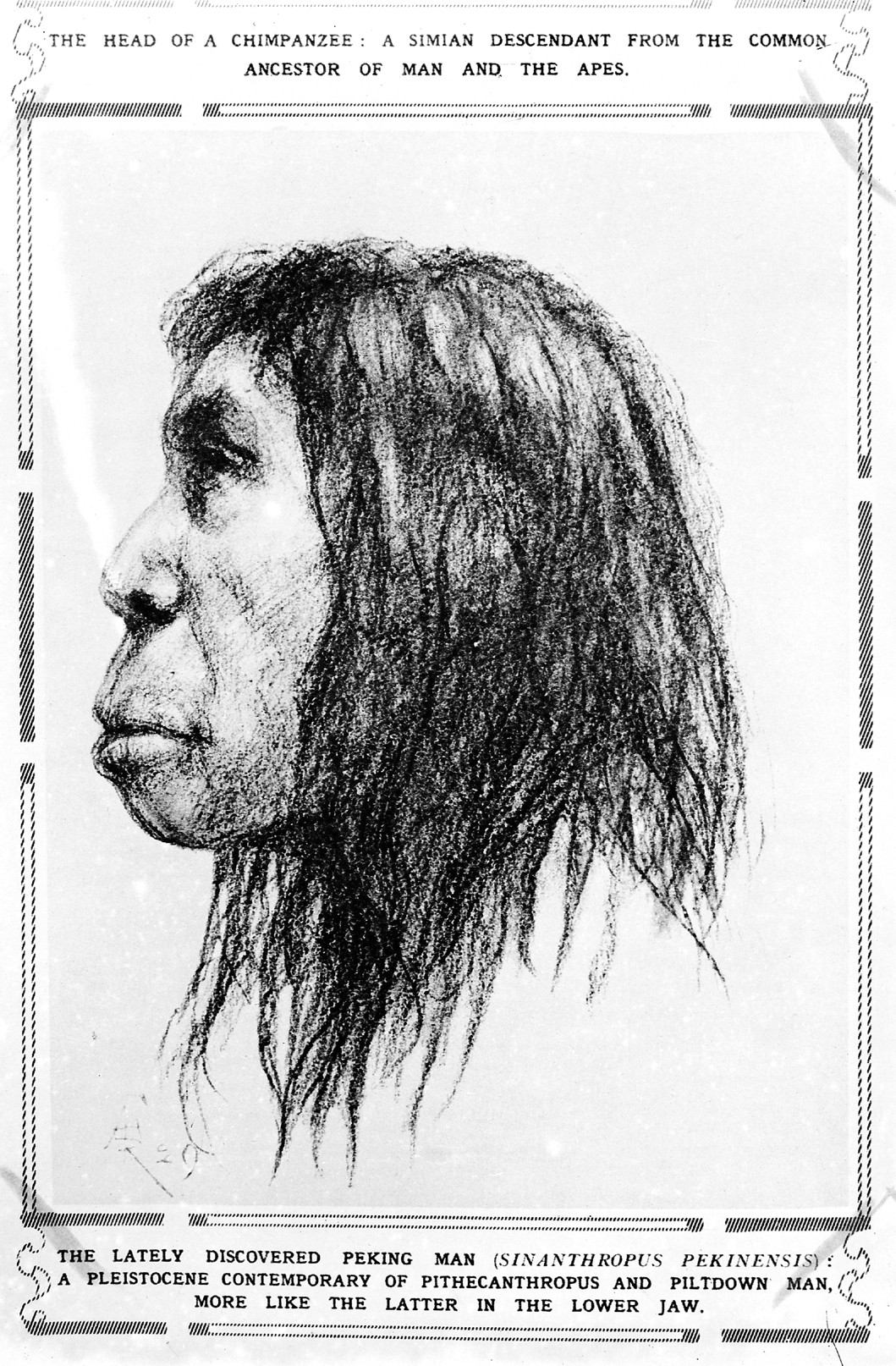
Sketch of "The Lately Discovered Peking Man" published in The Sphere

He joined the ongoing excavations of the Peking Man Site at Zhoukoudian as an advisor in 1926 and continued in the role for the Cenozoic Research Laboratory of the China Geological Survey following its founding in 1928. Teilhard resided in Manchuria with Émile Licent, staying in western Shanxi and northern Shaanxi with the Chinese paleontologist Yang Zhongjian and with Davidson Black, Chairman of the China Geological Survey.

After a tour in Manchuria in the area of Greater Khingan with Chinese geologists, Teilhard joined the team of American Expedition Center-Asia in the Gobi Desert, organized in June and July by the American Museum of Natural History with Roy Chapman Andrews. Henri Breuil and Teilhard discovered that the Peking Man, the nearest relative of Anthropopithecus from Java, was a faber (worker of stones and controller of fire). Teilhard wrote L'Esprit de la Terre (The Spirit of the Earth).

Teilhard took part as a scientist in the Croisière Jaune (Yellow Cruise) financed by André Citroën in Central Asia. Northwest of Beijing in Kalgan, he joined the Chinese group who joined the second part of the team, the Pamir group, in Aksu City. He remained with his colleagues for several months in Ürümqi, capital of Xinjiang. In 1933, Rome ordered him to give up his post in Paris. Teilhard subsequently undertook several explorations in the south of China. He traveled in the valleys of the Yangtze and Sichuan in 1934, then, the following year, in Guangxi and Guangdong.

During all these years, Teilhard contributed considerably to the constitution of an international network of research in human paleontology related to the whole of eastern and southeastern Asia. He would be particularly associated in this task with two friends, Davidson Black and the Scot George Brown Barbour. Often he would visit France or the United States, only to leave these countries for further expeditions.

=== World travels ===
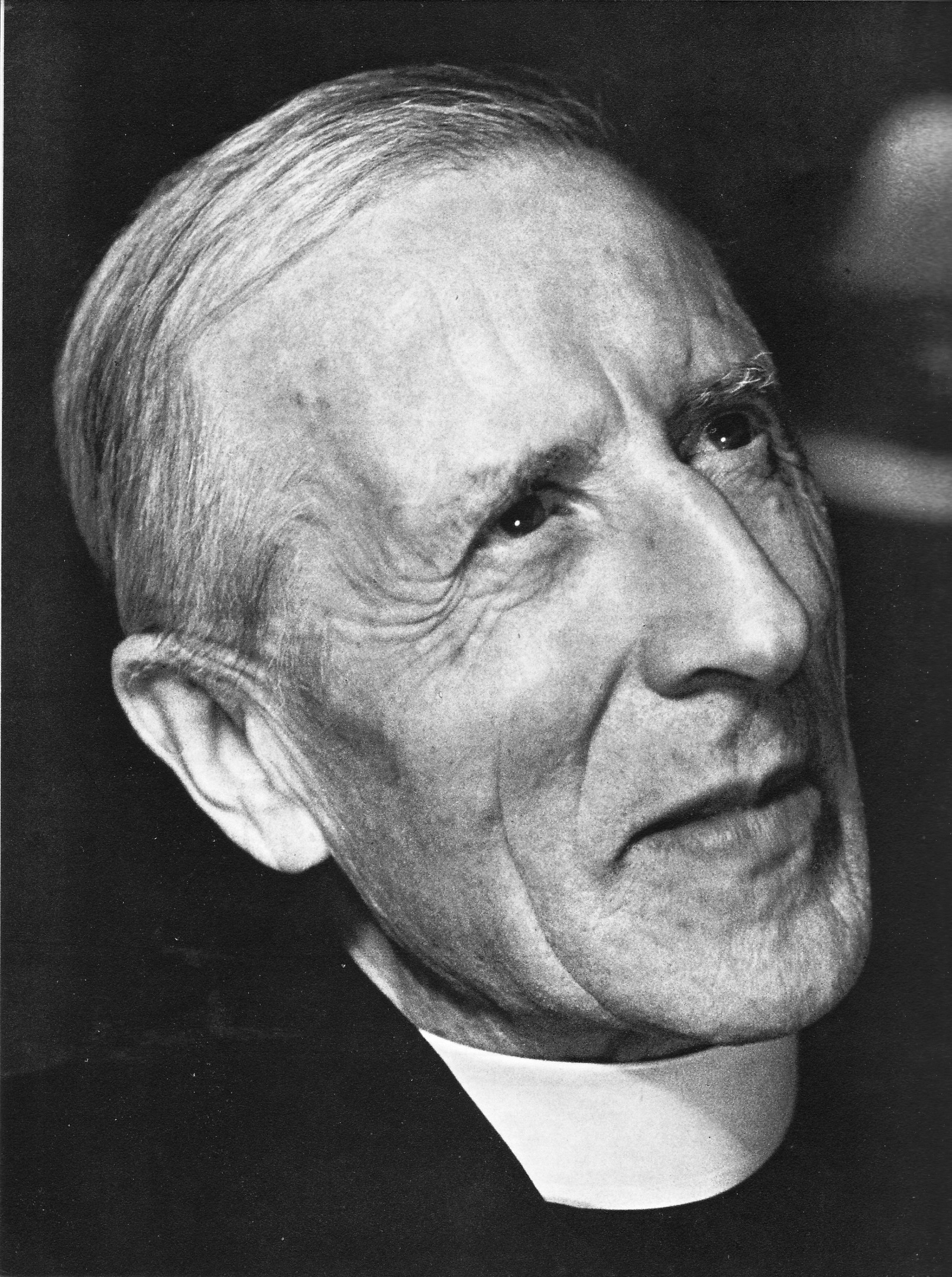
Pierre Teilhard de Chardin (1947)

From 1927 to 1928, Teilhard was based in Paris. He journeyed to Leuven, Belgium, and to Cantal and Ariège, France. Between several articles in reviews, he met new people such as Paul Valéry and Bruno de Solages, who were to help him in issues with the Catholic Church.

Answering an invitation from Henry de Monfreid, Teilhard undertook a journey of two months in Obock, in Harar in the Ethiopian Empire, and in Somalia with his colleague Pierre Lamarre, a geologist, before embarking in Djibouti to return to Tianjin. While in China, Teilhard developed a deep and personal friendship with Lucile Swan.

During 1930–1931, Teilhard stayed in France and in the United States. During a conference in Paris, Teilhard stated: "For the observers of the Future, the greatest event will be the sudden appearance of a collective humane conscience and a human work to make." From 1932 to 1933, he began to meet people to clarify issues with the Congregation for the Doctrine of the Faith regarding Le Milieu divin and L'Esprit de la Terre. He met Helmut de Terra, a German geologist in the International Geology Congress in Washington, D.C.

Teilhard participated in the 1935 Yale–Cambridge expedition in northern and central India with the geologist Helmut de Terra and Patterson, who verified their assumptions on Indian Paleolithic civilizations in Kashmir and the Salt Range Valley. He then made a short stay in Java, on the invitation of Dutch paleontologist Gustav Heinrich Ralph von Koenigswald to the site of Java Man. A second cranium, more complete, was discovered. Professor von Koenigswald had also found a tooth in a Chinese apothecary shop in 1934 that he believed belonged to a three-meter-tall ape, Gigantopithecus, which lived between one hundred thousand and around a million years ago. Fossilized teeth and bone (dragon bones) are often ground into powder and used in some branches of traditional Chinese medicine.

In 1937, Teilhard wrote Le Phénomène spirituel (The Phenomenon of the Spirit) on board the boat Empress of Japan, where he met Sylvia Brett, Ranee of Sarawak The ship took him to the United States. He received the Mendel Medal granted by Villanova University during the Congress of Philadelphia, in recognition of his works on human paleontology. He made a speech about evolution, the origins and the destiny of man. The New York Times dated 19 March 1937 presented Teilhard as the Jesuit who held that man descended from monkeys. Some days later, he was to be granted the Doctor Honoris Causa distinction from Boston College.

Rome banned his work L'Énergie Humaine in 1939. By this point Teilhard was based again in France, where he was immobilized by malaria. During his return voyage to Beijing he wrote L'Energie spirituelle de la Souffrance (Spiritual Energy of Suffering) (Complete Works, tome VII).

In 1941, Teilhard submitted to Rome his most important work, Le Phénomène Humain. By 1947, Rome forbade him to write or teach on philosophical subjects. The next year, Teilhard was called to Rome by the Superior General of the Jesuits who hoped to acquire permission from the Holy See for the publication of Le Phénomène Humain. However, the prohibition to publish it that was previously issued in 1944 was again renewed. Teilhard was also forbidden to take a teaching post in the Collège de France. Another setback came in 1949, when permission to publish Le Groupe Zoologique was refused.

Teilhard was nominated to the French Academy of Sciences in 1950. He was forbidden by his superiors to attend the International Congress of Paleontology in 1955. The Supreme Authority of the Holy Office, in a decree dated 15 November 1957, forbade the works of de Chardin to be retained in libraries, including those of religious institutes. His books were not to be sold in Catholic bookshops and were not to be translated into other languages.

Further resistance to Teilhard's work arose elsewhere. In April 1958, all Jesuit publications in Spain ("Razón y Fe", "Sal Terrae","Estudios de Deusto", etc.) carried a notice from the Spanish Provincial of the Jesuits that Teilhard's works had been published in Spanish without previous ecclesiastical examination and in defiance of the decrees of the Holy See. A decree of the Holy Office dated 30 June 1962, under the authority of Pope John XXIII, warned:

[I]t is obvious that in philosophical and theological matters, the said works [Teilhard's] are replete with ambiguities or rather with serious errors which offend Catholic doctrine. That is why... the Rev. Fathers of the Holy Office urge all Ordinaries, Superiors, and Rectors... to effectively protect, especially the minds of the young, against the dangers of the works of Fr. Teilhard de Chardin and his followers.

The Diocese of Rome on 30 September 1963 required Catholic booksellers in Rome to withdraw his works as well as those that supported his views.

=== Death ===
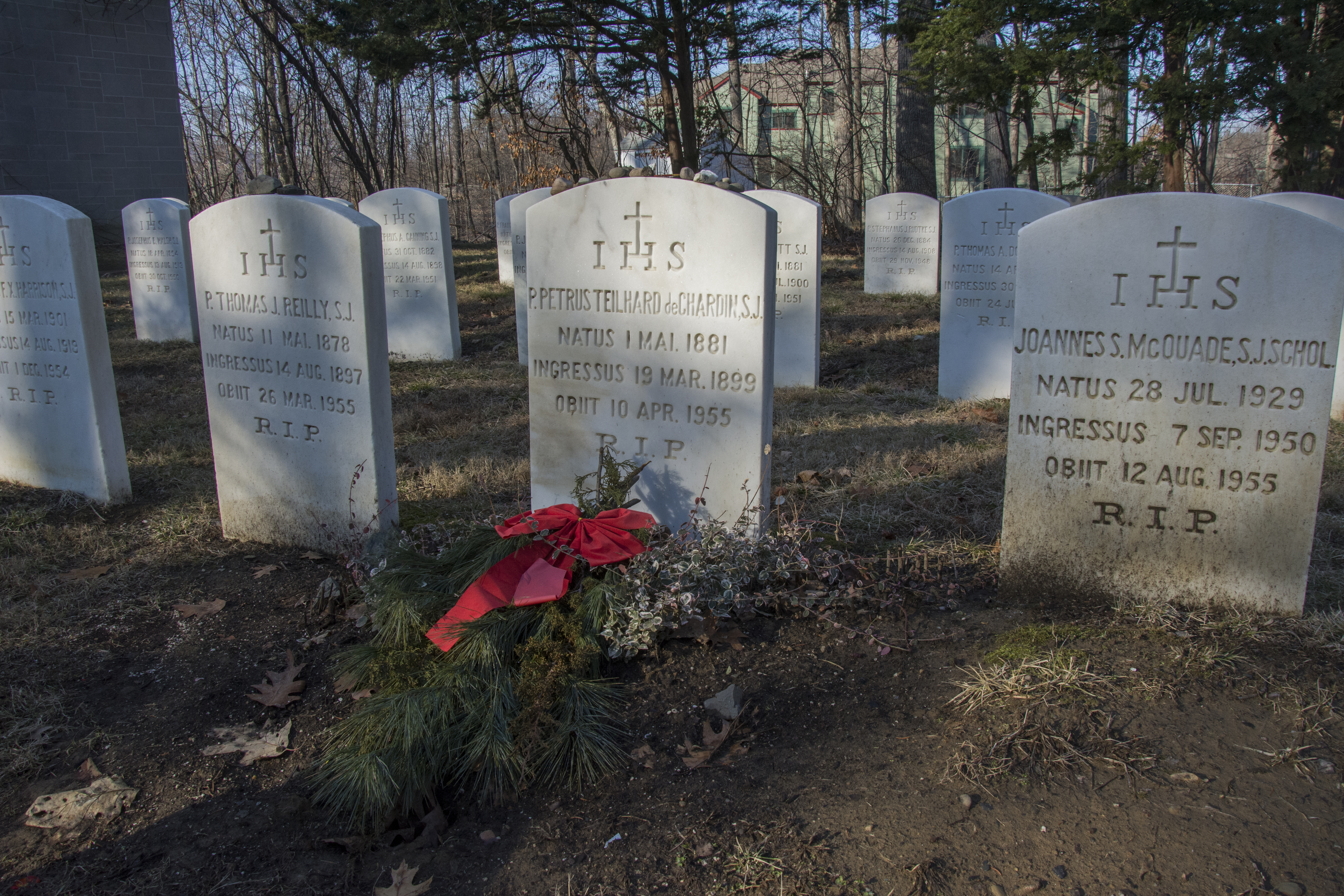
Grave at the cemetery of the former Jesuit novitiate in Hyde Park, New York

Teilhard died in New York City, where he was in residence at the Jesuit Church of St. Ignatius Loyola, Park Avenue. On 15 March 1955, at the house of his diplomat cousin Jean de Lagarde, Teilhard told friends he hoped he would die on Easter Sunday. On the evening of Easter Sunday, 10 April 1955, during an animated discussion at the apartment of Rhoda de Terra, his personal assistant since 1949, Teilhard suffered a heart attack and died. He was buried in the cemetery for the New York Province of the Jesuits at the Jesuit novitiate, St. Andrew-on-Hudson, in Hyde Park, New York. With the moving of the novitiate, the property was sold to the Culinary Institute of America in 1970.

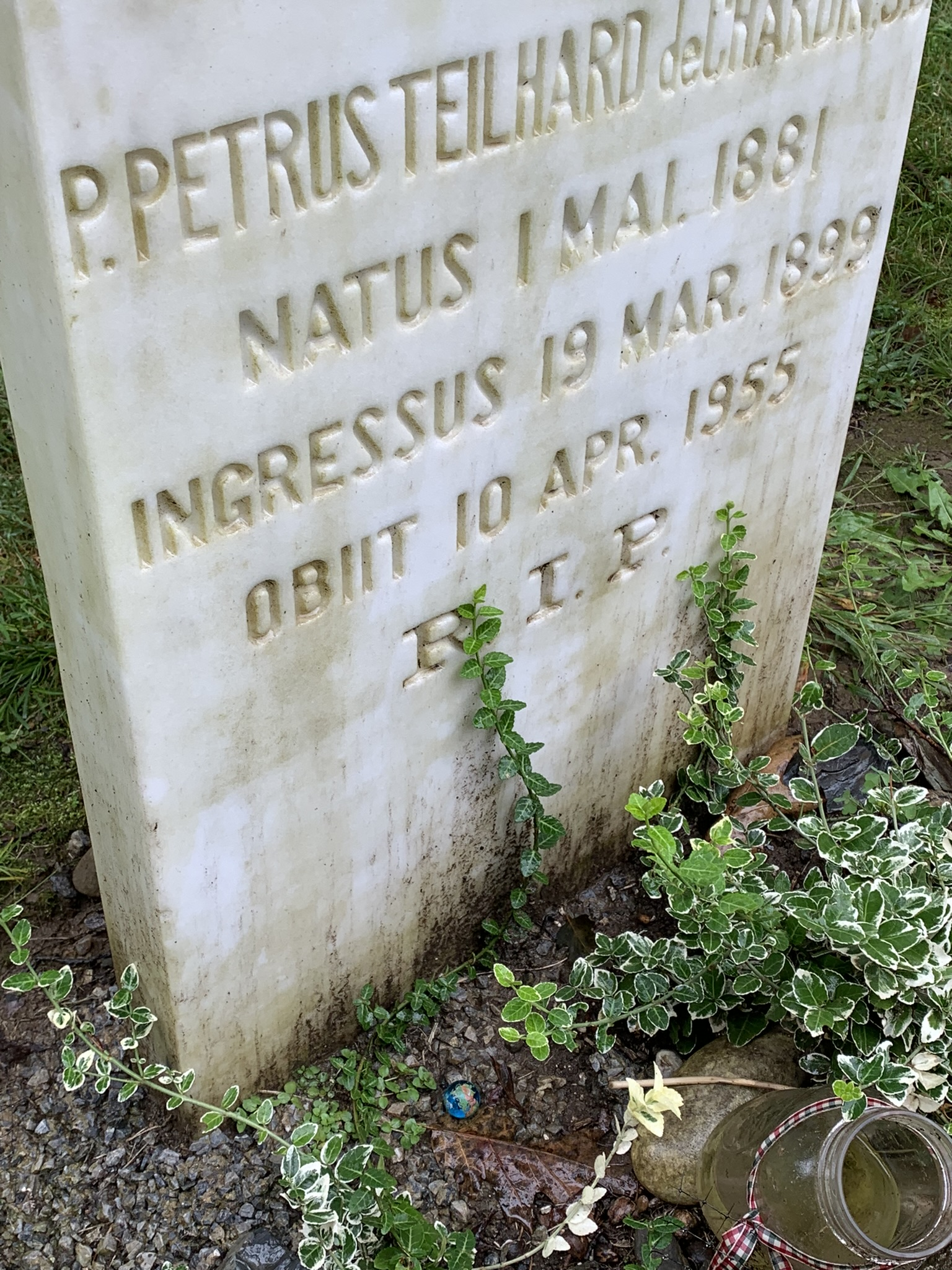
Recent image of Teilhard's grave in Hyde Park, New York

== Teachings ==
Teilhard de Chardin wrote two comprehensive works, The Phenomenon of Man and The Divine Milieu.

His posthumously published book, The Phenomenon of Man, set forth a sweeping account of the unfolding of the cosmos and the evolution of matter to humanity, to ultimately a reunion with Christ. In the book, Teilhard abandoned literal interpretations of creation in the Book of Genesis in favor of allegorical and theological interpretations. The unfolding of the material cosmos is described from primordial particles to the development of life, human beings and the noosphere, and finally to his vision of the Omega Point in the future, which is "pulling" all creation towards it. He was a leading proponent of orthogenesis, the idea that evolution occurs in a directional, goal-driven way. Teilhard argued in Darwinian terms with respect to biology, and supported the synthetic model of evolution, but argued in Lamarckian terms for the development of culture, primarily through the vehicle of education.

Teilhard made a total commitment to the evolutionary process in the 1920s as the core of his spirituality, at a time when other religious thinkers felt evolutionary thinking challenged the structure of conventional Christian faith. He committed himself to what he thought the evidence showed.

Teilhard made sense of the universe by assuming it had a vitalist evolutionary process. He interpreted complexity as the axis of evolution of matter into a geosphere, a biosphere, into consciousness (in man), and then to supreme consciousness (the Omega Point). Jean Houston's story of meeting Teilhard illustrates this point.

Teilhard's unique relationship to both paleontology and Catholicism allowed him to develop a highly progressive, cosmic theology which took into account his evolutionary studies. Teilhard recognized the importance of bringing the Church into the modern world, and approached evolution as a way of providing ontological meaning for Christianity, particularly creation theology. For Teilhard, evolution was "the natural landscape where the history of salvation is situated."

Teilhard's cosmic theology is largely predicated on his interpretation of Pauline scripture, particularly Colossians 1:15-17 (especially verse 1:17b) and 1 Corinthians 15:28. He drew on the Christocentrism of these two Pauline passages to construct a cosmic theology which recognizes the absolute primacy of Christ. He understood creation to be "a teleological process towards union with the Godhead, effected through the incarnation and redemption of Christ, 'in whom all things hold together' (Colossians 1:17)." He further posited that creation would not be complete until each "participated being is totally united with God through Christ in the Pleroma, when God will be 'all in all' (1 Corinthians 15:28)."

Teilhard's life work was predicated on his conviction that human spiritual development is moved by the same universal laws as material development. He wrote, "...everything is the sum of the past" and "...nothing is comprehensible except through its history. 'Nature' is the equivalent of 'becoming', self-creation: this is the view to which experience irresistibly leads us. ... There is nothing, not even the human soul, the highest spiritual manifestation we know of, that does not come within this universal law."

The Phenomenon of Man represents Teilhard's attempt at reconciling his religious faith with his academic interests as a paleontologist. One particularly poignant observation in Teilhard's book entails the notion that evolution is becoming an increasingly optional process. Teilhard points to the societal problems of isolation and marginalization as huge inhibitors of evolution, especially since evolution requires a unification of consciousness. He states that "no evolutionary future awaits anyone except in association with everyone else." Teilhard argued that the human condition necessarily leads to the psychic unity of humankind, though he stressed that this unity can only be voluntary; this voluntary psychic unity he termed "unanimization". Teilhard also states that "evolution is an ascent toward consciousness", giving encephalization as an example of early stages, and therefore, signifies a continuous upsurge toward the Omega Point which, for all intents and purposes, is God.

Teilhard also used his perceived correlation between spiritual and material to describe Christ, arguing that Christ not only has a mystical dimension but also takes on a physical dimension as he becomes the organizing principle of the universe—that is, the one who "holds together" the universe. For Teilhard, Christ formed not only the eschatological end toward which his mystical/ecclesial body is oriented, but he also "operates physically in order to regulate all things" becoming "the one from whom all creation receives its stability." In other words, as the one who holds all things together, "Christ exercises a supremacy over the universe which is physical, not simply juridical. He is the unifying center of the universe and its goal. The function of holding all things together indicates that Christ is not only man and God; he also possesses a third aspect—indeed, a third nature—which is cosmic."

In this way, the Pauline description of the Body of Christ was not simply a mystical or ecclesial concept for Teilhard; it is cosmic. This cosmic Body of Christ "extend[s] throughout the universe and compris[es] all things that attain their fulfillment in Christ [so that] ... the Body of Christ is the one single thing that is being made in creation." Teilhard describes this cosmic amassing of Christ as "Christogenesis". According to Teilhard, the universe is engaged in Christogenesis as it evolves toward its full realization at Omega, a point which coincides with the fully realized Christ. It is at this point that God will be "all in all" (1 Corinthians 15:28c).

Our century is probably more religious than any other. How could it fail to be, with such problems to be solved? The only trouble is that it has not yet found a God it can adore.

== Relationship with the Catholic Church ==
In 1925, Teilhard was ordered by the Superior General of the Society of Jesus, Włodzimierz Ledóchowski, to leave his teaching position in France and to sign a statement withdrawing his controversial statements regarding the doctrine of original sin. Rather than quit the Society of Jesus, Teilhard obeyed and departed for China.

This was the first of a series of condemnations by a range of ecclesiastical officials that would continue until after Teilhard's death. In August 1939, he was told by his Jesuit superior in Beijing, "Father, as an evolutionist and a Communist, you are undesirable here, and will have to return to France as soon as possible". The climax of these condemnations was a 1962 monitum (warning) of the Congregation for the Doctrine of the Faith cautioning on Teilhard's works. It said:

Several works of Fr. Pierre Teilhard de Chardin, some of which were posthumously published, are being edited and are gaining a good deal of success. Prescinding from a judgement about those points that concern the positive sciences, it is sufficiently clear that the above-mentioned works abound in such ambiguities and indeed even serious errors, as to offend Catholic doctrine. For this reason, the most eminent and most revered Fathers of the Holy Office exhort all Ordinaries as well as the superiors of Religious institutes, rectors of seminaries and presidents of universities, effectively to protect the minds, particularly of the youth, against the dangers presented by the works of Fr. Teilhard de Chardin and of his followers.

The Holy Office did not, however, place any of Teilhard's writings on the Index Librorum Prohibitorum (Index of Forbidden Books), which still existed during Teilhard's lifetime and at the time of the 1962 decree.

Shortly thereafter, prominent clerics mounted a strong theological defense of Teilhard's works. Henri de Lubac (later a Cardinal) wrote three comprehensive books on the theology of Teilhard de Chardin in the 1960s. While de Lubac mentioned that Teilhard was less than precise in some of his concepts, he affirmed the orthodoxy of Teilhard de Chardin and responded to Teilhard's critics: "We need not concern ourselves with a number of detractors of Teilhard, in whom emotion has blunted intelligence". Later that decade Joseph Ratzinger, a German theologian who became Pope Benedict XVI, spoke glowingly of Teilhard's Christology in Ratzinger's Introduction to Christianity:

It must be regarded as an important service of Teilhard de Chardin's that he rethought these ideas from the angle of the modern view of the world and, in spite of a not entirely unobjectionable tendency toward the biological approach, nevertheless on the whole grasped them correctly and in any case made them accessible once again.

On 20 July 1981, the Holy See stated that, after consultation of cardinals Casaroli and Šeper, the letter did not change the position of the warning issued by the Holy Office on 30 June 1962, which pointed out that Teilhard's work contained ambiguities and grave doctrinal errors.

Cardinal Ratzinger in his book The Spirit of the Liturgy incorporates Teilhard's vision as a touchstone of the Catholic Mass:

And so we can now say that the goal of worship and the goal of creation as a whole are one and the same—divinization, a world of freedom and love. But this means that the historical makes its appearance in the cosmic. The cosmos is not a kind of closed building, a stationary container in which history may by chance take place. It is itself movement, from its one beginning to its one end. In a sense, creation is history. Against the background of the modern evolutionary world view, Teilhard de Chardin depicted the cosmos as a process of ascent, a series of unions. From very simple beginnings the path leads to ever greater and more complex unities, in which multiplicity is not abolished but merged into a growing synthesis, leading to the "Noosphere" in which spirit and its understanding embrace the whole and are blended into a kind of living organism. Invoking the epistles to the Ephesians and Colossians, Teilhard looks on Christ as the energy that strives toward the Noosphere and finally incorporates everything in its "fullness". From here Teilhard went on to give a new meaning to Christian worship: the transubstantiated Host is the anticipation of the transformation and divinization of matter in the christological "fullness". In his view, the Eucharist provides the movement of the cosmos with its direction; it anticipates its goal and at the same time urges it on.

Cardinal Avery Dulles said in 2004:

In his own poetic style, the French Jesuit Teilhard de Chardin liked to meditate on the Eucharist as the first fruits of the new creation. In an essay called The Monstrance he describes how, kneeling in prayer, he had a sensation that the Host was beginning to grow until at last, through its mysterious expansion, "the whole world had become incandescent, had itself become like a single giant Host". Although it would probably be incorrect to imagine that the universe will eventually be transubstantiated, Teilhard correctly identified the connection between the Eucharist and the final glorification of the cosmos.

Cardinal Christoph Schönborn wrote in 2007:

Hardly anyone else has tried to bring together the knowledge of Christ and the idea of evolution as the scientist (paleontologist) and theologian Fr. Pierre Teilhard de Chardin, S.J., has done. ... His fascinating vision ... has represented a great hope, the hope that faith in Christ and a scientific approach to the world can be brought together. ... These brief references to Teilhard cannot do justice to his efforts. The fascination which Teilhard de Chardin exercised for an entire generation stemmed from his radical manner of looking at science and Christian faith together.

In July 2009, Vatican spokesman Federico Lombardi said, "By now, no one would dream of saying that [Teilhard] is a heterodox author who shouldn't be studied."

Pope Francis refers to Teilhard's eschatological contribution in his encyclical Laudato si'.

The philosopher Dietrich von Hildebrand criticized severely the work of Teilhard. According to Hildebrand, in a conversation after a lecture by Teilhard: "He (Teilhard) ignored completely the decisive difference between nature and supernature. After a lively discussion in which I ventured a criticism of his ideas, I had an opportunity to speak to Teilhard privately. When our talk touched on St. Augustine, he exclaimed violently: 'Don't mention that unfortunate man; he spoiled everything by introducing the supernatural.'" Von Hildebrand writes that Teilhardism is incompatible with Christianity, substitutes efficiency for sanctity, dehumanizes man, and describes love as merely cosmic energy.

== Evaluations by scientists ==
=== Julian Huxley ===
Julian Huxley, the evolutionary biologist, in the preface to the 1955 edition of The Phenomenon of Man, praised the thought of Teilhard de Chardin for looking at the way in which human development needs to be examined within a larger integrated universal sense of evolution, though admitting he could not follow Teilhard all the way. In the publication Encounter, Huxley wrote: "The force and purity of Teilhard's thought and expression ... has given the world a picture not only of rare clarity but pregnant with compelling conclusions."

=== Theodosius Dobzhansky ===
Theodosius Dobzhansky, writing in 1973, drew upon Teilhard's insistence that evolutionary theory provides the core of how man understands his relationship to nature, calling him "one of the great thinkers of our age". Dobzhansky was renowned as the president of four prestigious scientific associations: the Genetics Society of America, the American Society of Naturalists, the Society for the Study of Evolution and the American Society of Zoologists. He also called Teilhard "one of the greatest intellects of our time."

=== Daniel Dennett ===
Daniel Dennett claimed "it has become clear to the point of unanimity among scientists that Teilhard offered nothing serious in the way of an alternative to orthodoxy; the ideas that were peculiarly his were confused, and the rest was just bombastic redescription of orthodoxy."

=== David Sloan Wilson ===
In 2019, evolutionary biologist David Sloan Wilson praised Teilhard's book The Phenomenon of Man as "scientifically prophetic in many ways", and considers his own work as an updated version of it, commenting that "[m]odern evolutionary theory shows that what Teilhard meant by the Omega Point is achievable in the foreseeable future."

=== Robert Francoeur ===
Robert Francoeur (1931-2012), the American biologist, said the Phenomenon of Man "will be one of the few books that will be remembered after the dust of the century has settled on many of its companions."

=== Stephen Jay Gould ===
In an essay published in the magazine Natural History (and later compiled as the 16th essay in his book Hen's Teeth and Horse's Toes), American biologist Stephen Jay Gould made a case for Teilhard's guilt in the Piltdown Hoax, arguing that Teilhard had made several compromising slips of the tongue in his correspondence with paleontologist Kenneth Oakley, in addition to what Gould termed to be his "suspicious silence" about Piltdown despite having been, at that moment in time, an important milestone in his career. In a later book, Gould claims that Steven Rose wrote that "Teilhard is revered as a mystic of genius by some, but among most biologists is seen as little more than a charlatan."

Numerous scientists and Teilhard experts have refuted Gould's theories about Teilhard's guilt in the hoax, saying they are based on inaccuracies. In an article in New Scientist in September, 1981, Peter Costello said claims that Teilhard had been silent were factually wrong: "Much else of what is said about Teilhard is also wrong. …. After the exposure of the hoax, he did not refuse to make a statement; he gave a statement to the press on 26 November 1953, which was published in New York and London the next day. .... If questions needed to be asked about Teilhard's role in the Piltdown affair, they could have been asked when he was in London during the summer of 1953. They were not asked. But enough is now known to prove Teilhard innocent of all involvement in the hoax." Teilhard also wrote multiple letters about the hoax at the request of and in reply to Oakley, one of the 3 scientists who uncovered it, in an effort to help them get to the bottom of what occurred 40 years earlier.

Another of the three scientists, S.J. Weiner said he spoke to Teilhard extensively about Piltdown and "He (Teilhard) discussed all the points that I put to him perfectly frankly and openly." Weiner spent years investigating who was responsible for the hoax and concluded that Charles Dawson was the sole culprit. He also said: "Gould would have you accept that Oakley was the same mind (as himself); but it is not so. When Gould's article came out Oakley dissociated himself from it. ...I have seen Oakley recently and he has no reservations... about his belief that Teilhard had nothing to do with the planting of this material and manufacture of the fraud."

In November, 1981, Oakley himself published a letter in New Scientist saying: "There is no proved factual evidence known to me that supports the premise that Father Teilhard de Chardin gave Charles Dawson a piece of fossil elephant molar tooth as a souvenir of his time spent in North Africa. This faulty thread runs throughout the reconstruction ... After spending a year thinking about this accusation, I have at last become convinced that it is erroneous." Oakley also pointed out that after Teilhard got his degree in paleontology and gained experience in the field, he published scientific articles that show he found the scientific claims of the two Piltdown leaders to be incongruous, and that Teilhard did not agree they had discovered an ape-man that was a missing link between apes and humans.

In a comprehensive rebuttal of Gould in America magazine, Mary Lukas said his claims about Teilhard were "patently ridiculous" and "wilder flights of fancy" that were easily disprovable and weak. For example, she notes Teilhard was only briefly and minimally involved in the Piltdown project for four reasons: 1) He was only a student in his early days of studying paleontology. 2) His college was in France and he was at the Piltdown site in Britain for a total of just 5 days over a short period of three months out of the 7-year project. 3) He was simply a volunteer assistant, helping with basic digging. 4) This limited involvement ended prior to the most important claimed discovery, due to his being conscripted to serve in the French army. She added: "Further, according to his letters, both published and unpublished, to friends, Teilhard's relationship to Dawson was anything but close."

Lukas said Gould made the claims for selfish reasons: "The charge gained Mr. Gould two weeks of useful publicity and prepared reviewers to give a friendly reception to the collection of essays" that he was about to publish. She said Teilhard was "beyond doubt the most famous of" all the people who were involved in the excavations" and "the one who could gather headlines most easily…. The shock value of the suggestion that the philosopher-hero was also a criminal was stunning." Two years later, Lukas published a more detailed article in the British scholarly journal Antiquity in which she further refuted Gould, including an extensive timeline of events.

Winifred McCulloch wrote a very detailed rebuttal of Gould, calling his claim "highly subjective," "very idiosyncratic," filled with clear "weaknesses" and "shown to be impossible." She said Weiner had criticized Gould's accusations in a talk at Georgetown University in 1981. She also noted that Oakley wrote in a letter to Lukas in 1981 that her article in America constituted "a total refutation of Gould's interpretation of Teilhard's letters to me in 1953-1954. . . . You have . . . unearthed evidence that will seriously undermine Gould's confidence in having any evidence against Teilhard in regard to what he (Teilhard) said in his letters to me." She wrote: "Gould's method of presenting his main argument might be called inferred intent - projecting onto Teilhard ways of thinking and acting that have no evidential base and are completely foreign to all we know of Teilhard. With Gould it seems that the guilty verdict came first, then he created a persona to fit the crime."

=== Peter Medawar ===
In 1961, British immunologist and Nobel laureate Peter Medawar wrote a scornful review of The Phenomenon of Man for the journal Mind: "the greater part of it [...] is nonsense, tricked out with a variety of metaphysical conceits, and its author can be excused of dishonesty only on the grounds that before deceiving others he has taken great pains to deceive himself. [...] Teilhard practiced an intellectually unexacting kind of science [...]. He has no grasp of what makes a logical argument or what makes for proof. He does not even preserve the common decencies of scientific writing, though his book is professedly a scientific treatise. [...] Teilhard habitually and systematically cheats with words [...], uses in metaphor words like energy, tension, force, impetus, and dimension as if they retained the weight and thrust of their special scientific usages. [...] It is the style that creates the illusion of content."

In 2014, Donald Wayne Viney evaluated Medawar's review and concluded that the case made against Teilhard was "remarkably thin, marred by misrepresentations and elementary philosophical blunders." These defects, Viney noted, were uncharacteristic of Medawar's other work.

In another response, John Allen Grim said when Teilhard "wrote The Phenomenon of Man … he was using science there in a very broad sense. What he was really looking for was to be actually more radically empirical than conventional science is. Conventional science leaves out so much that's really there, especially our own subjectivity and some of the other things that are qualitative and value laden that are going on in the world. That science … has abstracted from values, meaning, subjectivity, purpose, God, and talked only about physical causation. Teilhard knew this, because when he wrote his [science journal] papers, he didn't bring God, value and so forth into it. But when he wrote The Phenomenon, he was doing something different. But it's not against the spirit of science. It was to actually expand the empirical orientation of science to take into account things that science unfortunately leaves out, like consciousness, for example, which today, in a materialist worldview, doesn't even exist, and yet it's the most palpable experience that any of us has. So if you try to construct a worldview that leaves out something so vital and important as mind to subjectivity, then that's unempirical, that's irrelevant. What we need is a radically empirical approach to the world that includes within what he calls hyperphysics, the experience of consciousness and also the experiences of faith, religions."

=== Richard Dawkins ===
Evolutionary biologist and a New Atheist Richard Dawkins called Medawar's review "devastating" and The Phenomenon of Man "the quintessence of bad poetic science".

=== Karl Stern ===
Karl Stern, the neurobiologist of the Montreal Neurological Institute, wrote: "It happens so rarely that science and wisdom are blended as they were in the person of Teilhard de Chardin."

=== George Gaylord Simpson ===
George Gaylord Simpson felt that if Teilhard were right, the lifework "of Huxley, Dobzhansky, and hundreds of others was not only wrong, but meaningless", and was mystified by their public support for him. He considered Teilhard a friend and his work in paleontology extensive and important, but expressed strongly adverse views of his contributions as scientific theorist and philosopher.

=== William G. Pollard ===
William G. Pollard, the physicist and founder of the prestigious Oak Ridge Institute of Nuclear Studies (and its director until 1974), praised Teilhard's work as "A fascinating and powerful presentation of the amazing fact of the emergence of man in the unfolding drama of the cosmos."

=== John Barrow and Frank Tipler ===
John Barrow and Frank Tipler, both physicists and cosmologists, base much of their work on Teilhard and use some of his key terms such as the Omega point. However, Manuel Alfonseca, author of 50 books and 200 technical articles, said in an article in the quarterly Popular Science: "Barrow and Tipler have not understood Teilhard (apparently they have just read 'The Phenomenon of Man', at least this is the only work by Teilhard they mention). In fact, they have got everything backwards."

=== Wolfgang Smith ===
Wolfgang Smith, an American scientist versed in Catholic theology, devotes an entire book to the critique of Teilhard's doctrine, which he considers neither scientific (assertions without proofs), nor Catholic (personal innovations), nor metaphysical (the "Absolute Being" is not yet absolute), and of which the following elements can be noted (all the words in quotation marks are Teilhard's, quoted by Smith):

==== Evolution ====
Smith claims that for Teilhard, evolution is not only a scientific theory but an irrefutable truth "immune from any subsequent contradiction by experience"; it constitutes the foundation of his doctrine. Matter becomes spirit and humanity moves towards a super-humanity thanks to complexification (physico-chemical, then biological, then human), socialization, scientific research and technological and cerebral development; the explosion of the first atomic bomb is one of its milestones, while waiting for "the vitalization of matter by the creation of super-molecules, the remodeling of the human organism by means of hormones, control of heredity and sex by manipulation of genes and chromosomes [...]".

==== Matter and spirit ====
Teilhard maintains that the human spirit (which he identifies with the anima and not with the spiritus) originates in a matter which becomes more and more complex until it produces life, then consciousness, then the consciousness of being conscious, holding that the immaterial can emerge from the material. At the same time, he supports the idea of the presence of embryos of consciousness from the very genesis of the universe: "We are logically forced to assume the existence [...] of some sort of psyche" infinitely diffuse in the smallest particle.

==== Theology ====
Smith believes that since Teilhard affirms that "God creates evolutively", he denies the Book of Genesis, not only because it attests that God created man, but that he created him in his own image, thus perfect and complete, then that man fell, that is to say the opposite of an ascending evolution. That which is metaphysically and theologically "above" - symbolically speaking - becomes for Teilhard "ahead", yet to come; even God, who is neither perfect nor timeless, evolves in symbiosis with the World, (Note: "I see in the World a mysterious product of completion and fulfillment for the absolute Being himself." The Heart of Matter, Harcourt Brace Jovanovich, New York, 1979, p. 54 - quoted in Wolfgang Smith, Teilhardism and the New Religion, Tan Books & Pub, Gastonia/NC, USA, 1988, p. 104.) which Teilhard, a resolute pantheist, venerates as the equal of the Divine. As for Christ, not only is he there to activate the wheels of progress and complete the evolutionary ascent, but he himself evolves. (Note: "It is Christ, in all truth, who saves, but should we not immediately add that at the same time it is Christ who is saved by evolution?" The Heart of Matter, Harcourt Brace Jovanovich, New York, 1979, p. 92 - quoted in Wolfgang Smith, Teilhardism and the New Religion, Tan Books & Pub, Gastonia/NC, USA, 1988, p. 117.).

==== New religion ====
As he wrote to a cousin: "What dominates my interests increasingly is the effort to establish in me and define around me a new religion (call it a better Christianity, if you will)...", and elsewhere: "a Christianity re-incarnated for a second time in the spiritual energies of Matter". The more Teilhard refines his theories, the more he emancipates himself from established Christian doctrine: a "religion of the earth" must replace a "religion of heaven". By their common faith in Man, he writes, Christians, Marxists, Darwinists, materialists of all kinds will ultimately join around the same summit: the Christic Omega Point.

=== Lucien Cuénot ===
Lucien Cuénot, the biologist who proved that Mendelism applied to animals as well as plants through his experiments with mice, wrote: "Teilhard's greatness lay in this, that in a world ravaged by neurosis he provided an answer to out modern anguish and reconciled man with the cosmos and with himself by offering him an "ideal of humanity that, through a higher and consciously willed synthesis, would restore the instinctive equilibrium enjoyed in ages of primitive simplicity."

== Legacy ==
Brian Swimme wrote "Teilhard was one of the first scientists to realize that the human and the universe are inseparable. The only universe we know about is a universe that brought forth the human."

George Gaylord Simpson named the most primitive and ancient genus of true primate, the Eocene genus Teilhardina.

On June 25, 1947 Teilhard was honored by the French Ministry of Foreign Affairs for "Outstanding services to the intellectual and scientific influence of France" and was promoted to the rank of Officer in the Legion of Honor. In 1950, Teilhard was elected a member of the French Academy of Sciences.

=== Influence on arts and culture ===
Teilhard and his work continue to influence the arts and culture.

- Characters based on Teilhard appear in several novels, including Jean Telemond in Morris West's The Shoes of the Fisherman (mentioned by name and quoted by Oskar Werner playing Fr. Telemond in the movie version of the novel).
- In Dan Simmons' 1989–97 Hyperion Cantos, Teilhard de Chardin has been canonized a saint in the far future.
- His work inspires the anthropologist priest character, Paul Duré. When Duré becomes Pope, he takes Teilhard I as his regnal name.
- Teilhard appears as a minor character in the play Fake by Eric Simonson, staged by Chicago's Steppenwolf Theatre Company in 2009, involving a fictional solution to the infamous Piltdown Man hoax.

There is a broad range of references to Teilhard ranging from quotations, as when an auto mechanic cites Teilhard in Philip K. Dick's A Scanner Darkly to philosophical underpinning of an entire plot, as Teilhard's work does in Julian May's 1987–94 Galactic Milieu Series.

- Teilhard also plays a major role in Annie Dillard's 1999 For the Time Being.
- Teilhard is mentioned by name and the Omega Point briefly explained in Arthur C. Clarke's and Stephen Baxter's The Light of Other Days.
- The title of the short story Everything That Rises Must Converge and the eponymous story collection by Flannery O'Connor is a reference to Teilhard's work.
- The American novelist Don DeLillo's 2010 novel Point Omega borrows its title and some of its ideas from Teilhard de Chardin.
- Robert Wright, in his book Nonzero: The Logic of Human Destiny, compares his own naturalistic thesis that biological and cultural evolution are directional and, possibly, purposeful, with Teilhard's ideas.
- Teilhard's work also inspired philosophical ruminations by Italian laureate architect Paolo Soleri and Mexican writer Margarita Casasús Altamirano
- Robert Hamblin's book of poems, Dust and Light (Ars Omnia Press, 2012), treats Teilhard's life and work.

In artworks:

- French painter Alfred Manessier's L'Offrande de la terre ou Hommage à Teilhard de Chardin
- American sculptor Frederick Hart's acrylic sculpture The Divine Milieu: Homage to Teilhard de Chardin.
- A sculpture of the Omega Point by Henry Setter, with a quote from Teilhard de Chardin, can be found at the entrance to the Roesch Library at the University of Dayton.
- The Spanish painter Salvador Dalí was fascinated by Teilhard de Chardin and the Omega Point theory. His 1959 painting The Ecumenical Council is said to represent the "interconnectedness" of the Omega Point.
- Edmund Rubbra's 1968 Symphony No. 8 is titled Hommage à Teilhard de Chardin.

The Embracing Universe, an oratorio for choir and 7 instruments, composed by Justin Grounds to a libretto by Fred LaHaye saw its first performance in 2019. It is based on the life and thought of Teilhard de Chardin.

College campuses:

- A building at the University of Manchester,
- residence dormitories at Gonzaga University,
- residence dormitories at Seattle University.

The De Chardin Project, a play celebrating Teilhard's life, ran from 20 November to 14 December 2014 in Toronto, Canada. The Evolution of Teilhard de Chardin, a documentary film on Teilhard's life, was scheduled for release in 2015.

Founded in 1978, George Addair based much of Omega Vector on Teilhard's work.

The American physicist Frank J. Tipler has further developed Teilhard's Omega Point concept in two controversial books, The Physics of Immortality and the more theologically based Physics of Christianity. While keeping the central premise of Teilhard's Omega Point (i.e. a universe evolving towards a maximum state of complexity and consciousness) Tipler has supplanted some of the more mystical/ theological elements of the OPT with his own scientific and mathematical observations (as well as some elements borrowed from Freeman Dyson's eternal intelligence theory).

In 1972, the Uruguayan priest Juan Luis Segundo, in his five-volume series A Theology for Artisans of a New Humanity, wrote that Teilhard "noticed the profound analogies existing between the conceptual elements used by the natural sciences—all of them being based on the hypothesis of a general evolution of the universe."

=== Influence of his cousin Marguerite Teilard Chambon ===
Marguerite Teillard-Chambon, (alias Claude Aragonnès) was a French writer who edited and had published three volumes of correspondence with her cousin, Pierre Teilhard de Chardin, "La genèse d'une pensée" ("The Making of a Mind") being the last, after her own death in 1959. She furnished each with an introduction. Marguerite, a year older than Teilhard, was considered among those who knew and understood him best. They had shared a childhood in Auvergne; she it was who encouraged him to undertake a doctorate in science at the Sorbonne; she eased his entry into the Catholic Institute, through her connection to Emmanuel de Margerie and she introduced him to the intellectual life of Paris. Throughout the First World War, she corresponded with him, acting as a "midwife" to his thinking, helping his thought to emerge and honing it. In September 1959 she participated in a gathering organised at Saint-Babel, near Issoire, devoted to Teilhard's philosophical contribution. On the way home to Chambon-sur-Lac, she was fatally injured in a road traffic accident. Her sister, Alice, completed the final preparations for the publication of the final volume of her cousin Teilhard's wartime letters.

=== Influence on the New Age movement ===
Teilhard has had a profound influence on the New Age movements and has been described as "perhaps the man most responsible for the spiritualization of evolution in a global and cosmic context".

=== Alleged support of eugenics and racism ===
Teilhard has been criticized by the theologian John P. Slattery for allegedly incorporating elements of scientific racism, social Darwinism, and eugenics into his work. He argued in 1929 that racial inequality was rooted in biological difference: "Do the yellows—[the Chinese]—have the same human value as the whites? [Fr.] Licent and many missionaries say that their present inferiority is due to their long history of Paganism. I'm afraid that this is only a 'declaration of pastors.' Instead, the cause seems to be the natural racial foundation…" In a letter from 1936 explaining his Omega Point conception, he rejected both the Fascist quest for particularistic hegemony and the Christian/Communist insistence on egalitarianism: "As not all ethnic groups have the same value, they must be dominated, which does not mean they must be despised—quite the reverse … In other words, at one and the same time there should be official recognition of: (1) the primacy/priority of the earth over nations; (2) the inequality of peoples and races. Now the second point is currently reviled by Communism … and the Church, and the first point is similarly reviled by the Fascist systems (and, of course, by less gifted peoples!)". In the essay 'Human Energy' (1937), he asked, "What fundamental attitude … should the advancing wing of humanity take to fixed or definitely unprogressive ethnical groups? The earth is a closed and limited surface. To what extent should it tolerate, racially or nationally, areas of lesser activity? More generally still, how should we judge the efforts we lavish in all kinds of hospitals on saving what is so often no more than one of life's rejects? … To what extent should not the development of the strong … take precedence over the preservation of the weak?" The theologian John P. Slattery interprets this last remark to suggest "genocidal practices for the sake of eugenics".

Even after World War II Teilhard continued to argue for racial and individual eugenics in the name of human progress, and denounced the United Nations declaration of the Equality of Races (1950) as "scientifically useless" and "practically dangerous" in a letter to the agency's director Jaime Torres Bodet. In 1953, he expressed his frustration at the Church's failure to embrace the scientific possibilities for optimising human nature, including by the separation of sexuality from reproduction (a notion later developed e.g. by the second-wave feminist Shulamith Firestone in her 1970 book The Dialectic of Sex), and postulated "the absolute right … to try everything right to the end—even in the matter of human biology".

The theologian John F. Haught has defended Teilhard from Slattery's charge of "persistent attraction to racism, fascism, and genocidal ideas" by pointing out that Teilhard's philosophy was not based on racial exclusion but rather on union through differentiation, and that Teilhard took seriously the human responsibility for continuing to remake the world. With regard to union through differentiation, he underlined the importance of understanding properly a quotation used by Slattery in which Teilhard writes, "I hate nationalism and its apparent regressions to the past. But I am very interested in the primacy it returns to the collective. Could a passion for 'the race' represent a first draft of the Spirit of the Earth?" Writing from China in October 1936, shortly after the outbreak of the Spanish Civil War, Teilhard expressed his stance towards the new political movement in Europe, "I am alarmed at the attraction that various kinds of Fascism exert on intelligent (?) people who can see in them nothing but the hope of returning to the Neolithic". He felt that the choice between what he called "the American, the Italian, or the Russian type" of political economy (i.e. liberal capitalism, Fascist corporatism, Bolshevik Communism) had only "technical" relevance to his search for overarching unity and a philosophy of action.

=== Other ===
Fritjof Capra's systems theory book The Turning Point: Science, Society, and the Rising Culture positively contrasts Teilhard with Darwinian evolution.

== Bibliography ==
The dates in parentheses are the dates of first publication in French and English. Most of these works were written years earlier, but Teilhard's ecclesiastical order forbade him to publish them because of their controversial nature. The essay collections are organized by subject rather than date, thus each one typically spans many years.

- Le Phénomène Humain (1955), written 1938–40, scientific exposition of Teilhard's theory of evolution.
  - The Phenomenon of Man (1959), Harper Perennial 1976: ISBN 978-0-06-090495-1. Reprint 2008: ISBN 978-0-06-163265-5.
  - The Human Phenomenon (1999), Brighton: Sussex Academic, 2003: ISBN 978-1-902210-30-8.
- Letters From a Traveler (1956; English translation 1962), written 1923–55.
- Le Groupe Zoologique Humain (1956), written 1949, more detailed presentation of Teilhard's theories.
  - Man's Place in Nature (English translation 1966).
- Le Milieu Divin (1957), spiritual book written 1926–27, in which the author seeks to offer a way for everyday life, i.e. the secular, to be divinized.
  - The Divine Milieu (1960) Harper Perennial 2001: ISBN 978-0-06-093725-6.
- L'Avenir de l'Homme (1959) essays written 1920–52, on the evolution of consciousness (noosphere).
  - The Future of Man (1964) Image 2004: ISBN 978-0-385-51072-1.
- Hymn of the Universe (1961; English translation 1965) Harper and Row: ISBN 978-0-06-131910-5, mystical/spiritual essays and thoughts written 1916–55.
- L'Energie Humaine (1962), essays written 1931–39, on morality and love.
  - Human Energy (1969) Harcort Brace Jovanovich ISBN 978-0-15-642300-7.
- L'Activation de l'Energie (1963), sequel to Human Energy, essays written 1939–55 but not planned for publication, about the universality and irreversibility of human action.
  - Activation of Energy (1970), Harvest/HBJ 2002: ISBN 978-0-15-602817-2.
- Je M'Explique (1966) Jean-Pierre Demoulin, editor ISBN 978-0-685-36593-9, "The Essential Teilhard" — selected passages from his works.
  - Let Me Explain (1970) Harper and Row ISBN 978-0-06-061800-1, Collins/Fontana 1973: ISBN 978-0-00-623379-4.
- Christianity and Evolution, Harvest/HBJ 2002: ISBN 978-0-15-602818-9.
- The Heart of Matter, Harvest/HBJ 2002: ISBN 978-0-15-602758-8.
- Toward the Future, Harvest/HBJ 2002: ISBN 978-0-15-602819-6.
- The Making of a Mind: Letters from a Soldier-Priest 1914–1919, Collins (1965), Letters written during wartime.
- Writings in Time of War, Collins (1968) composed of spiritual essays written during wartime. One of the few books of Teilhard to receive an imprimatur.
- Vision of the Past, Collins (1966) composed of mostly scientific essays published in the French science journal Etudes.
- The Appearance of Man, Collins (1965) composed of mostly scientific writings published in the French science journal Etudes.
- Letters to Two Friends 1926–1952, Fontana (1968). Composed of personal letters on varied subjects including his understanding of death. See Letters to Two Friends 1926–1952. Translated by Weaver, Helen. New American Library. 1968. ISBN 978-0-85391-143-2. OCLC 30268456.
- Letters to Léontine Zanta, translated by Bernard Wall, Collins (1969).
- Correspondence / Pierre Teilhard de Chardin, Maurice Blondel, Herder and Herder (1967) This correspondence also has both the imprimatur and nihil obstat.
- de Chardin, P T (1952). "On the zoological position and the evolutionary significance of Australopithecines". Transactions of the New York Academy of Sciences. 14 (5) (published March 1952): 208–10. doi:10.1111/j.2164-0947.1952.tb01101.x. PMID 14931535.
- de Terra, H; de Chardin, PT; Paterson, TT (1936). "Joint geological and prehistoric studies of the Late Cenozoic in India". Science. 83 (2149) (published 6 March 1936): 233–236. Bibcode:1936Sci....83..233D. doi:10.1126/science.83.2149.233-a. PMID 17809311.
- Teilhard, Pierre (1922). Les Mammifères de l'Éocène inférieur français et leurs gisements (Doctoral thesis).

== See also ==
- Thomas Berry
- Henri Bergson
- Henri Breuil
- Henri de Lubac
- John Polkinghorne
- Georges Lemaître
- Edouard Le Roy
- Law of Complexity/Consciousness
- Philosophy of science
- List of Jesuit scientists
- List of Roman Catholic scientist-clerics
- List of science and religion scholars
