= Dyson's eternal intelligence =

Hypothetical concept in astrophysics

Dyson's eternal intelligence is a theoretical framework, proposed by Freeman Dyson in his 1979 paper "Time without end: Physics and biology in an open universe," through which an intelligent form of life could perform an infinite number of computations, and thus experience an infinite subjective time using only a finite amount of energy. This concept relies on the life form adapting its metabolism and speed of thought to the decreasing temperature of an open, ever-expanding universe. The mathematical precision of the theory is rooted in the principles of thermodynamics, information theory, and the ultimate physical limits of computation.

== Energy expenditure and hibernation ==
The core of Dyson's idea is a strategy of energy conservation. An intelligent civilization would begin by storing a finite amount of energy, $E_{total}$. They would then live their lives in cycles of activity and hibernation. In each cycle, they expend a fixed fraction, $f$, of their remaining energy.

For example, if $f = 1/2$:

- In the first cycle, they use $E_1 = \frac{1}{2} E_{total}$.
- In the second cycle, they use half of the remainder: $E_2 = \frac{1}{2} \left(E_{total} - \frac{1}{2} E_{total}\right) = \frac{1}{4} E_{total}$.
- In the third cycle, they use $E_3 = \frac{1}{2} \left(E_{total} - \frac{1}{2} E_{total} - \frac{1}{4} E_{total}\right) = \frac{1}{8} E_{total}$.

The total energy consumed after $N$ cycles is the sum of a geometric series:

$$E_{consumed} = \sum_{n=1}^{N} \frac{1}{2^n} E_{total} = E_{total} \left(1 - \frac{1}{2^N}\right)$$

As $N \to \infty$, the total energy consumed approaches $E_{total}$. This demonstrates that an infinite number of cycles of activity can be powered by a finite initial energy store. During each period of activity, the beings think a finite number of thoughts, but since there are an infinite number of such periods, their total subjective time (the sum of all their thoughts) is infinite. The long periods of hibernation between active phases are crucial, as they allow the beings to radiate away waste heat and wait for the ambient temperature of the universe to drop.

== Temperature, energy per thought, and Landauer's limit ==
The physical possibility of this scenario depends on the relationship between energy and information processing at very low temperatures. Dyson's model assumes that thought is a form of computation. According to Landauer's principle, there is a minimum thermodynamic energy cost associated with erasing one bit of information, which is a fundamental step in irreversible computation. This minimum energy is given by:

$$E_{bit} = k_B T \ln(2)$$

where:

- $k_B$ is the Boltzmann constant ($\approx 1.38 \times 10^{-23}$ J/K),
- $T$ is the absolute temperature of the system at which the computation occurs.

The crucial insight is that as the universe expands and cools, the ambient temperature $T$ approaches zero. Consequently, the minimum energy required to process a bit of information also approaches zero. If a single "thought" is assumed to require the processing of a fixed number of bits, $Q$, then the energy cost per thought, $\Delta E_{thought}$, is:

$$\Delta E_{thought} = Q \cdot k_B T \ln(2)$$

As $T \to 0$, $\Delta E_{thought} \to 0$. This allows the intelligent beings to afford an infinite number of thoughts with their finite energy budget, provided they perform these thoughts at progressively lower temperatures.

== Time per computational step and scaling laws ==
A consequence of performing computations at ever-lower temperatures and with ever-decreasing energy is that the speed of these computations must also decrease dramatically. The subjective experience of the beings might remain constant, but the objective cosmic time elapsed for each thought would lengthen. Dyson postulated that a life-form could adapt by slowing down its metabolic processes, so that its rate of subjective experience scales with the ambient temperature.

Let $\tau_s$ be the subjective time and $\tau_o$ be the objective (cosmic) time. Dyson proposed a scaling law where the rate of energy dissipation, $\frac{dE}{d\tau_o}$, required to maintain a certain rate of subjective experience, $\frac{d\tau_s}{d\tau_o}$, is proportional to some power of the temperature:

$\frac{dE}{d\tau_o} \propto T^n$ (for a fixed rate of subjective experience).

To make thoughts possible with ever-decreasing energy, the beings must stretch out their computational steps over longer periods of objective time. The time required for one thought, $\Delta\tau_{thought}$, would therefore grow infinitely long as the temperature drops:

$\Delta\tau_{thought} \propto \frac{1}{T^\alpha}$ for some positive exponent $\alpha$.

The hibernation periods must also become progressively longer to allow the universe to cool to the required temperature for the next, even lower-energy, thought process.

== Bremermann's limit ==
Bremermann's limit provides the ultimate constraint on the speed of computation, establishing a ceiling that Dyson's intelligent beings would operate far beneath. The limit states the maximum rate of computation that can be achieved by any self-contained system of a given mass, based on the mass-energy equivalence and the Heisenberg uncertainty principle. The limit is given by:

$$R_{max} = \frac{c^2}{h} \approx 1.356 \times 10^{50} \text{ bits per second per kilogram}$$

where:

- $c$ is the speed of light,
- $h$ is the Planck constant.

This can be derived from the uncertainty principle for energy and time, $\Delta E \Delta t \ge \frac{\hbar}{2}$, and Einstein's mass-energy equivalence, $E=mc^2$. A system of mass $m$ has a maximum energy of $mc^2$, which sets the ultimate limit on the energy uncertainty $\Delta E$. The minimum time $\Delta t$ to transition to a new distinguishable state (equivalent to one computational operation) is therefore proportional to $h/\Delta E$.

In the context of Dyson's eternal intelligence, Bremermann's limit represents the absolute fastest that a thought could possibly be processed by a brain or computer of a given mass. However, the strategy for eternal survival requires the exact opposite: deliberately slowing down computation to infinitesimal speeds to conserve energy, thus always remaining far from this ultimate physical limit.

Dyson noted that "in an accelerated universe everything is different". A key assumption in Dyson's original proposal is that the universe will continue to cool down indefinitely, allowing the ambient temperature $T$ to approach zero. However, this assumption is challenged by the observed accelerated expansion of the universe, which is attributed to a positive cosmological constant, $\Lambda$. In such a de Sitter-like universe, there is a fundamental lower limit to the temperature that any observer can experience. This minimum temperature is known as the Gibbons-Hawking temperature, which arises from the thermal radiation produced by the cosmological event horizon. The vacuum state in this spacetime is the Bunch-Davies vacuum, and for an accelerating observer, this vacuum appears as a thermal bath with a temperature proportional to the acceleration. As the universe continues its accelerated expansion, the temperature will asymptotically approach a non-zero value:

$$T_{min} = \frac{\hbar c}{2\pi k_B R_h} = \frac{\hbar}{2\pi k_B} \sqrt{\frac{\Lambda c^2}{3}}$$

where $R_h$ is the radius of the cosmological event horizon. Because the temperature never falls below this minimum, Landauer's principle implies a permanent, non-zero minimum energy cost for erasing a bit of information. This establishes a finite lower bound on the energy required for any computational thought, $\Delta E_{thought} > Q \cdot k_B T_{min} \ln(2)$. Consequently, with only a finite initial store of energy, only a finite number of thoughts can ever be processed. This "thermal death" of the universe prevents the infinite hibernation and computation trick from working, thus rendering Dyson's eternal intelligence scenario impossible in a universe with a positive cosmological constant.

== Reversible computing ==
Dyson's analysis of eternal intelligence is fundamentally based on the thermodynamics of irreversible computation. The core of his argument rests on Landauer's principle, which states that any logically irreversible manipulation of information, such as erasing a bit, must dissipate a minimum amount of energy as heat, equal to $k_B T \ln(2)$. Dyson's intelligent beings overcome this by performing computations at progressively lower temperatures, thereby reducing the energy cost per thought toward zero. This entire framework is invalidated, however, by the principle of reversible computation.

Reversible computing is a model of computation where all processes are logically and, in principle, thermodynamically reversible. A logically reversible operation is one where the input can always be uniquely determined from the output, meaning no information is erased or destroyed. Charles Bennett showed that any computation can, in principle, be performed in a logically reversible manner. Crucially, a logically reversible computation does not have a fundamental lower bound of energy dissipation and can, in theory, be performed with zero energy cost. This circumvents Landauer's principle entirely, as the principle only applies to irreversible operations that destroy information.

If an intelligent civilization could master reversible computing, the central pillar of Dyson's argument would collapse. There would be no need to hibernate and wait for the universe to cool, because the energy cost per thought ($\Delta E_{thought}$) would not be tied to the ambient temperature $T$. A finite amount of energy could, in principle, power an infinite amount of reversible computation at any non-zero temperature, without the need for the elaborate scheme of dissipating progressively smaller fractions of energy. The entire strategy of slowing down thought to match the cooling of the universe becomes unnecessary. While practical implementations of reversible computing face immense engineering challenges, its theoretical possibility fundamentally undermines the thermodynamic constraints that make Dyson's scenario for eternal intelligence both necessary and plausible.

== Legacy ==
Frank J. Tipler has cited Dyson's writings, and specifically his writings on the eternal intelligence, as a major influence on his own highly controversial Omega Point theory. Tipler's theory differs from Dyson's theory on several key points, most notable of which is that Dyson's eternal intelligence presupposes an open universe while Tipler's Omega Point presupposes a closed/contracting universe. Both theories will be invalidated if the observed universal expansion continues to accelerate.

== See also ==
- Reversible computing – Concept in computer science
- Supertask – Infinitely many tasks in finite time
- Zeno's paradoxes – Set of philosophical problems
