= Helmut de Terra =

German anthropologist (1900–1981)

Helmut de Terra, c. 1960

Helmut de Terra (4 July 1900, Guben, Germany – 22 July 1981, Bern, Switzerland) was a German geologist, explorer, archaeologist, author and anthropologist.

== Early life ==
Helmut de Terra was born in Germany in 1900 in a family of French Huguenot origin. He received his education at Marburg University. During childhood, he got interest in travel and natural science which led him to study geology and geography. He received a PhD at the Ludwig-Maximilians-Universität München.

== Career ==
After university study, he began his research in Asia from 1927 to 1928 as a member of a German-Swiss expedition to Central Asia, which soon made his name well known. Crossing the Himalayas into Tibet and Chinese Turkestan prepared him for later expeditions to Kashmir, India, Burma and Java. He conducted a number of scientific expeditions into Asia and the Americas. He was the first to produce a glaciological map of the Eastern Himalayas and to advance the theory that humans were established in Asia almost as early as in Africa.

Thereafter, he accepted teaching and research positions at Yale University and the Carnegie Institution of Washington. Under their auspices, he conducted three scientific missions to Asia, discovering stone-age cultures and collecting fossil remains of man's remotest ancestors as well as making significant contributions to our knowledge of man's geologic antiquity.

He was a close friend and colleague of Pierre Teilhard de Chardin. Teilhard joined de Terra's 1935 Yale-Cambridge India Expedition, and together they carried out research in Burma in 1938. They were both invited to Java in 1938 by G. H. R. von Königswald to confirm the dating of strata in which he had found a skullcap of Java Java Man. In 1964, de Terra published a book on him, Memories of Teilhard de Chardin. In February 1947, he discovered Tepexpan Man in the Valley of Mexico, which is generally regarded as the beginning of Mexican prehistory. His work in Mexico was supported by the Wenner Gren Foundation (formerly the Viking Fund). Eminent persons suggested to the President of Mexico that Dr. de Terra be made an honorary citizen of Mexico. In 1955, he published a well-received biography of Alexander von Humboldt, which has been translated into Spanish. He continued to spend time in Mexico and correspond with colleagues throughout the 1950s. In 1958, Mexico's Instituto Nacional de Antropología e Historia (National Institute of Anthropology and History) completed work on and inaugurated the Museo de Tepexpan built on the site of the 1947 discovery. In the late 1950s and 1960s, Dr. de Terra was an adjunct professor in the History of Science at Columbia University. He was then named director of the Werner Reimers Foundation for Anthropological Research in Frankfurt. He has published extensively, including scientific monographs and books, popular books and articles, and has lectured at many institutions in Europe and North America.

== Death ==
He continued writing in his later years and died in Switzerland in 1981.
