= Bernard Wall (writer) =

Bernard Joseph Wall (1908-1974) was an English author, publisher, and a leading translator of modern Italian literature into English. He was educated at Stonyhurst College, at Oxford University, and at the University of Fribourg in Switzerland. He was active in the Catholic intellectual movement along with his wife Barbara, a novelist writing under her maiden name Barbara Lucas.

Bernard Wall founded the publications "Colosseum" and "Changing World", and wrote a regular column in the Catholic Herald.

== Selected writings ==
- Spain of the Spaniards, Sheed & Ward (1937)
- European Notebook, Sheed & Ward (1939)
- These Changing Years, Harvill Press (1947)
- Headlong into Change: An autobiography and a memoir of ideas since the Thirties, Harvill Press (1969).

== Selected translations ==
Twentieth-century Italian Literature in English Translation, published in 1998, named him one of the leading translators of Italian literature during the previous 70 years, alongside Archibald Colquhoun, Patrick Creagh, Angus Davidson, Frances Frenaye, Stuart Hood, Eric Mosbacher, Isabel Quigly, Raymond Rosenthal and William Weaver.

=== Translations from Italian ===
- Gino Severini, The artist and society, Harvill Press (1946)
- Maria Bellonci, The Life and Times of Lucrezia Borgia (Lucrezia Borgia. La sua vita e i suoi tempi) (tr. with Barbara Wall), Harcourt Brace (1953)
- Alberto Moravia, Bitter Honeymoon and other stories (tr. with Baptista Gilliat Smith and Frances Frenaye), Secker & Warburg (1954)
- Elio Vittorini, Women on the Road: three short novels (tr. with Frances Keene), Jonathan Cape (1961)
- Alberto Moravia, Man as an end (L'uomo come fine e altri saggi), Secker & Warburg (1965)
- Mario Soldati, The Orange Envelope, (La busta arancione), Harcourt Brace, Andre Deutsch (1966)
- Luigi Santucci, Meeting Jesus: A New Way to Christ (Volete andarvene anche voi?, Herder and Herder, 1971; published in Britain as Wrestling with Christ Collins, (1972) - winner of the John Florio Prize in 1973
- Andrea Giovene, The Dilemma of Love (Autobiografia di Giuliano di Sansevero - 1st part), Houghton Mifflin, Collins (1973)
- Andrea Giovene, The Dice of War (Autobiografia di Giuliano di Sansevero - 2nd part), Houghton Mifflin, Collins (1974)

He also contributed translations to Twentieth-century Italian poetry: a bilingual anthology ed. L. R. Lind, The Bobbs-Merril Company, (c.1974)

=== Translations from French ===
- Pierre Teilhard de Chardin, The Phenomenon of Man, (Le Phénomène humain) (1959)
- Pierre Teilhard de Chardin, Letters to Léontine Zanta (Lettres à Léontine Zanta), Collins (1969)
- Julien Green, The Other One (L'autre), Harcourt Brace, Collins (1973)
