= Tepexpan man =

Pre-Columbian Mexican skeleton

Tepexpan Man
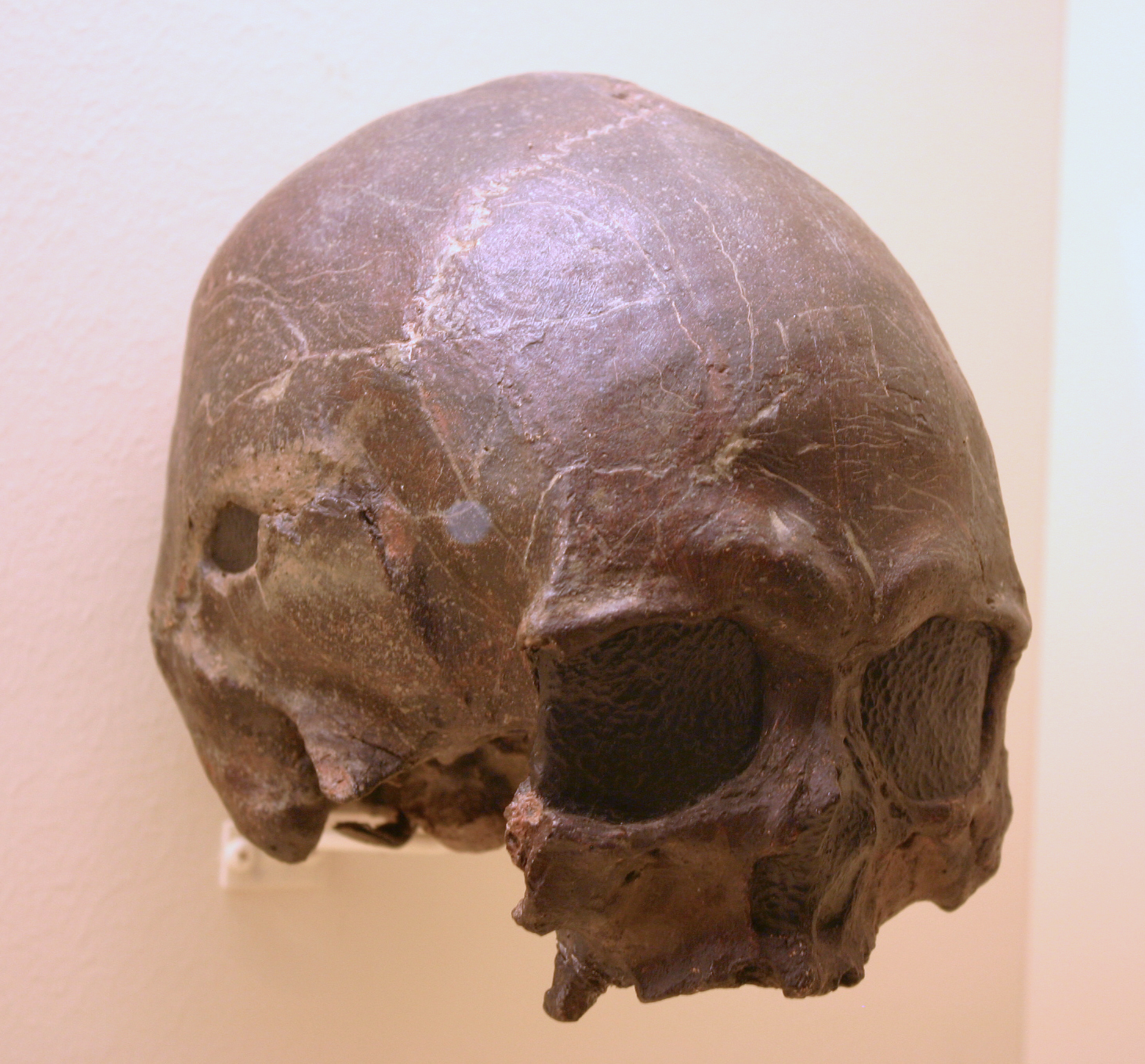
- Tepexpan 1. Replica.
- Born: c. 8,040 B.C
- Died: c. 8,000 B.C (aged c. 40) now Mexico
- Body discovered: February 1947 by Helmut Terra

The Tepexpan Man is a Pre-Columbian-era skeleton, discovered by archaeologist Helmut de Terra in February 1947, on the shores of the former Lake Texcoco in central Mexico. The skeleton was found near mammoth remains and thought to be at least 10,000 years old. It was fancifully hailed by Time magazine as the oldest Mexican. The skeleton was found lying face down with the arms under the chest and the legs drawn up to the stomach. The body most likely sank into the mud surrounding it, leaving the shoulder, back, and hips exposed, which might explain why those elements are missing. It is possible that the body was originally deposited in the lake.

== Analysis ==
=== Age ===
Alluvial deposits overlaid by layers of calcium carbonate, lake sediments, and recent deposits dated the site where Tepexpan Man was found to about 8,000 to 10,000 years ago. Excavations revealed the remains of five mammoths which were found near the skeleton and associated with obsidian flakes. Therefore, it was originally believed that Tepexpan Man dated to about 10,000 years ago. However, years later, researchers revisited the skeleton and dated the remains using radiocarbon methods. It was then found to be closer to 2,000 years old. Dr. Silvia Gonzalez, a professor of geoarchaeology at John Moores University in Liverpool, used uranium isotope analysis to date the skeleton. Results showed that Tepexpan Man was 4,700 years old. She argues that contamination of the remains led to the obscured radiocarbon dates. Other critics have claimed that Tepexpan Man was an intrusion in that he was buried at a later date but dug into Pleistocene materials.

An analysis of Tepexpan Man that was published in the 1947 issue of The Science Newsletter claims that the individual was at least 40 at the time of death. This was determined by "united seams in the skull" (referring to sutures), and fused epiphyses in long bones.

=== Sex ===
In his preliminary report, Helmut de Terra claims that "The other bones, in conjunction with the skull, indicate that the person was of male sex." Based on DNA analysis, a Mexican archaeologist has proposed that Tepexpan 'man' was actually a woman.

=== Trauma ===
Tepexpan Man exhibits a healed fracture on his right ulna. De Terra hypothesized that due to his fracture and the proximity to mammoth fossils, Tepexpan Man may have been a hunter who was either killed by his fellow men or mortally wounded while hunting. The Science Newsletter claims that the individual suffered from a stiff neck due to the many limy deposits on the cervical vertebrae. This means that Tepexpan Man most likely suffered from arthritis.

=== Other ===
The Science Newsletter described Tepexpan man in its 1947 edition. It described Tepexpan Man as having "a high-domed, thin-walled skull" which contained "a brain the same size as those of present-day Indians." The writers described a "solidly built" jawline and "prominent" brow ridges, as well as a "sharply prominent chin" which would separate him from earlier Neanderthals. Tepexpan Man only had three teeth left in his upper jaw. In his lower jaw, all of the molars had disappeared before his death. This was evidenced by the alveolar sockets being healed and smoothed over in the mandible. What was left on the mandible included incisors, "eye-teeth," and premolars that were worn, but still in decent condition.

== Environment of Lake Texcoco ==
Dr. Gonzalez also reconstructed the environment of Lake Texcoco around the time of Tepexpan Man by analyzing sediments and fossils from the area. Dr. Gonzalez and her team analyzed sand, clay, and volcanic ash, as well as fossils of diatoms (microscopic algae) and ostracods (a form of small crustacean). When Tepexpan Man was alive, the lake was very deep, full of fish, and surrounded by trees. The environment surrounding Lake Texcoco experienced major changes over the past 20,000 years including several volcanic eruptions, changing water levels, and numerous types of vegetation. These environmental changes clearly affected populations living in the area. Today, Lake Texcoco is almost dried up. It sits on the northeast outskirts of Mexico City.

AMS radiocarbon dates associated with sedimentary succession at Tepexpan show ages between 19,110±90 and 612±2214C years BP. New uranium-series date the skeleton to 4,700±200 years BP, which would indicate a Holocene age. The sedimentary succession was studied through isotope analysis, diatoms, organic geochemistry, and tephrochronology. These lines of evidence suggest that there were large changes around Lake Texcoco in terms of the balance between aquatic and terrestrial plants, C3 and C4 plants, saline, alkaline and freshwater conditions, volcanic activity, reworking of lake sediments, and input from the drainage basin throughout the late Pleistocene and late Holocene. These changes also had large effects on the prehistoric human populations living around the lake at this time.

== See also ==
- List of human evolution fossils
