= Lucile Swan =

American sculptor

Lucile Swan (May 10, 1887 – May 2, 1965) was an American sculptor and artist.

== Early life ==
Lucile Swan was born in Sioux City, Iowa. She attended the Art Institute of Chicago from 1908 to 1912. In December 1912 she married painter Jerome Blum in Paris, France.

== Career ==
They traveled together to Corsica, Cuba, China, Japan, Tahiti and eventually settled in Greenwich Village, New York City. Swan and Blum were both prolific artists who worked while they traveled. Lucile divorced Jerome Blum in 1924.

Lucile moved to Peking, China in 1929. In 1937, as the assistant of Dr. Franz Weidenreich, she worked on reconstructing the skull of the Peking Man, a Homo erectus hominid, on a paleontological dig in China.

She also sculpted a bust of Jesuit priest Teilhard de Chardin, who was the geologist on the dig. She fell in love with him but he held to his priestly vows of celibacy. They kept up a long correspondence.

== Death ==
Swan died in New York City ten years after the death of de Chardin.
