= Léontine Zanta =

French philosopher, feminist and novelist (1872–1942)

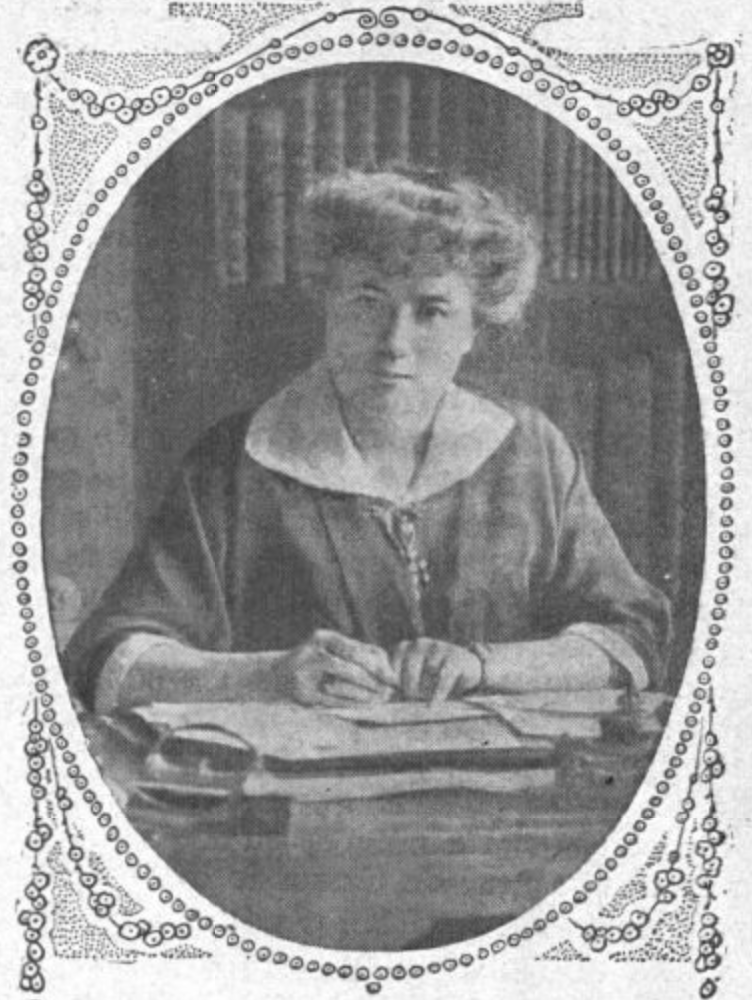

Léontine Zanta (14 February 1872 – 15 June 1942) was a French philosopher, feminist and novelist. One of the first two women to gain a doctorate in France, and the first to do so in philosophy, Zanta "was an intellectual celebrity in her day, active in journalism and in the feminist movement of the 1920s."

== Life ==
Zanta was born in Mâcon. Her doctoral thesis, defended in May 1914, was on the 16th-century revival of Stoicism. She never secured a position in higher education, and became a journalist and writer, publishing several novels.

She maintained a correspondence with Teilhard de Chardin.

In the late 1920s she received the Legion of Honour. Simone de Beauvoir remembered being inspired by her example as a woman philosopher.

== Works ==
- La renaissance du stoïcisme au XVIe siècle, 1914.
- (ed. with intro.) La traduction française du manuel d'Epictète d'André de Rivaudeau au XVIe siècle, 1914.
- Psychologie du féminisme, 1922
- La part du feu, 1927
- Sainte-Odile, 1931
