= Frank J. Tipler =

American physicist (born 1947)

Frank Jennings Tipler
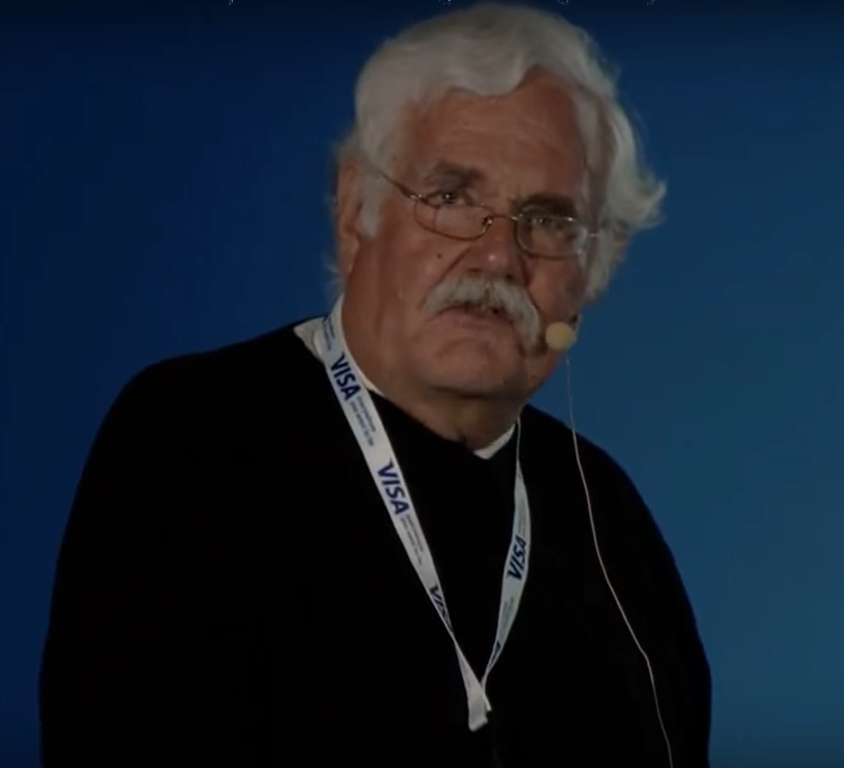
- Tipler in 2017
- Born: February 1, 1947 (age 79); Andalusia, Alabama
- Education: Massachusetts Institute of Technology (BS); University of Maryland, College Park (PhD)
- Occupation: Mathematical physicist
- Employer: Tulane University
- Known for: Omega point cosmology Tipler cylinder Hart–Tipler conjecture
- Website: https://sse.tulane.edu/node/3550

Frank Jennings Tipler (born February 1, 1947) is an American mathematical physicist and cosmologist, holding a joint appointment in the Departments of Mathematics and Physics at Tulane University. Tipler has written books and papers on the Omega Point based on Pierre Teilhard de Chardin's religious ideas, which he claims is a mechanism for the resurrection of the dead. He is also known for his theories on the Tipler cylinder time machine. His work has attracted criticism from many, for example cosmologist George Ellis, who has argued that his theories are largely pseudoscience.

== Biography ==
Tipler was born in Andalusia, Alabama, to Frank Jennings Tipler Jr., a lawyer, and Anne Tipler, a homemaker. Tipler attended the Massachusetts Institute of Technology from 1965 to 1969, where he completed a Bachelor of Science degree in physics. In 1976 he completed his PhD with the University of Maryland. Tipler was hired in a series of postdoctoral research positions at three universities, with the final one being at the University of Texas, working under John Archibald Wheeler, Abraham Taub, Rainer K. Sachs, and Dennis W. Sciama. Tipler became an associate professor in mathematical physics in 1981 and a full professor in 1987 at Tulane University, where he has been a faculty member ever since.

== The Omega Point cosmology ==
The Omega Point is a term Tipler uses to describe a cosmological state in the distant proper-time future of the universe. He claims that this point is required to exist due to the laws of physics. According to him, it is required, for the known laws of physics to be consistent, that intelligent life take over all matter in the universe and eventually force its collapse. During that collapse, the computational capacity of the universe diverges to infinity, and environments emulated with that computational capacity last for an infinite duration as the universe attains a cosmological singularity. This singularity is Tipler's Omega Point. With computational resources diverging to infinity, Tipler states that a society in the far future would be able to resurrect the dead by emulating alternative universes. Tipler identifies the Omega Point with God, since, in his view, the Omega Point has all the properties of God claimed by most traditional religions.

Tipler's argument of the Omega Point being required by the laws of physics is a more recent development that arose after the publication of his 1994 book The Physics of Immortality. In that book (and in papers he had published earlier), Tipler had offered the Omega Point cosmology as a hypothesis, while still claiming to confine the analysis to the known laws of physics.

Tipler, along with co-author physicist John D. Barrow, defined the "final anthropic principle" (FAP) in their 1986 book The Anthropic Cosmological Principle as a generalization of the anthropic principle:

"Intelligent information-processing must come into existence in the Universe, and, once it comes into existence, will never die out."

One paraphrase of Tipler's argument for FAP runs: For the universe to physically exist, it must contain living observers. Our universe obviously exists. There must be an "Omega Point" that sustains life forever.

Tipler purportedly used Dyson's eternal intelligence hypothesis to back up his arguments.

=== Reception ===
Tipler's Omega Point theory has been highly controversial. In the past (1997), physicist David Deutsch defended the physics of Omega Point cosmology, although he was highly critical of Tipler's theological conclusions and what Deutsch stated were exaggerated claims that caused other scientists and philosophers to reject his theory. However, Deutsch has since rejected the theory, referring to it as "refuted" and "ruled out by observation". Scholars are also skeptical of Tipler's argument that if an immortal entity with advanced technology exists in the future, such a being would necessarily resemble the Abrahamic God. Researcher Anders Sandberg wrote that the Omega Point Theory has many flaws, including missing proofs of its claims.

Tipler's Omega Point ideas have received vigorous criticism by physicists and skeptics. Some critics say its arguments violate the Copernican principle, that it incorrectly applies the laws of probability, and that it is really a theology or metaphysics principle made to sound plausible to laypeople by using the esoteric language of physics. Martin Gardner dubbed the final anthropic principle the "completely ridiculous anthropic principle" (CRAP). Oxford-based philosopher Nick Bostrom wrote that the final anthropic principle is "pure speculation" with no claim on any special methodological status, despite attempts to elevate it by calling it a "principle", but considers the Omega Point hypothesis as an interesting philosophical hypothesis in its own right. Philosopher Rem B. Edwards called the theory "futuristic, pseudoscientific eschatology" that is "highly conjectural, unverified, and improbable". A review in The New York Times described Tipler's "final anthropic principle" argument as "rather circular".

George Ellis, writing in the journal Nature, described Tipler's book on the Omega Point as "a masterpiece of pseudoscience… the product of a fertile and creative imagination unhampered by the normal constraints of scientific and philosophical discipline" and Tipler himself as 'the ultimate reductionist', citing Tipler's argument that 'religion is now a part of science'. Michael Shermer devoted a chapter of Why People Believe Weird Things to enumerating what he thought to be flaws in Tipler's thesis. Physicist Sean M. Carroll stated that Tipler's early work was constructive, but since then he has become a "crackpot". In a review of Tipler's The Physics of Christianity, Lawrence Krauss described the book as the most "extreme example of uncritical and unsubstantiated arguments put into print by an intelligent professional scientist".

John Polkinghorne described Tipler as having "extreme reductionism" and building a "cosmic tower of Babel". He also mentioned that Tipler's book "reads like the highest class of science fiction". Polkinghorne himself asserted that the hope of resurrection "lies not in the curiosity or calculation of a cosmic computer, but in the personal God who cares individually for each of His human creatures".

== Books ==
- Tipler, Frank J.; Barrow, John D. (1986). The Anthropic Cosmological Principle. Oxford University Press. ISBN 978-0-19-851949-2.
- Tipler, Frank J. (1994). The Physics of Immortality: Modern Cosmology, God and the Resurrection of the Dead. New York: Doubleday. ISBN 0385467982.
- Tipler, Frank J. (2007). The Physics of Christianity. New York: Doubleday. ISBN 978-0-385-51424-8.

== See also ==
- Black dwarf
- Digital physics
- Idealism
- Quantum immortality
- Ultimate fate of the universe

== Bibliography ==
- Tipler, Frank J (1976), Causality Violation in General Relativity (PhD thesis), University of Maryland, Bibcode:1976PhDT........61T.
- ——— (June 1989), "The Omega Point as Eschaton: Answers to Pannenberg's Questions for Scientists", Zygon, 24 (2): 217–53, doi:10.1111/j.1467-9744.1989.tb01112.x, S2CID 170514707.
- ——— (1997) [1994], The Physics of Immortality: Modern Cosmology, God and the Resurrection of the Dead, New York: Doubleday, ISBN 978-0-385-46798-8.
- ———; Graber, Jessica; McGinley, Matthew; Nichols-Barrer, Joshua; Staecker, Christopher (August 2007) [March 20, 2000], "Closed Universes With Black Holes But No Event Horizons As a Solution to the Black Hole Information Problem", Monthly Notices of the Royal Astronomical Society, 379 (2): 629–40, arXiv:gr-qc/0003082, Bibcode:2007MNRAS.379..629T, doi:10.1111/j.1365-2966.2007.11895.x, S2CID 17109604.
