= Ore Place =

Ruined manor house in Hastings, England

- Location within East Sussex
- 50.879223°N 0.5847064°E
- Location: Hastings, East Sussex

History
- Built: late 16c/early 17c

Scheduled monument
- Official name: Manor house (remains of), Ore Place
- Designated: 4 December 2014
- Reference no.: 1002271

Ore Place are the ruins of a significant late medieval manor house in the northern outskirts of Hastings, East Sussex, England. The remaining parts of the building consist of walls up to 3m high and 0.7m thick and below ground archaeological remains. It is a Scheduled monument.

== History ==
Historian Thomas Walker Horsfield claimed in his History of Sussex that Ore Place was built by John of Gaunt. Based on a 1991 partial excavation, the building is thought to date from the late 16c or early 17c.

Horsfield also states the building had been used as a religious home, the home of Sir Richard Steele, and subsequently the residence of the Crispe family.

The house was rebuilt in 1874 and became the home of the Dowager Lady Elphinstone. Ore Place subsequently came under the ownership of the eccentric Farmer Atkinson who allowed it to fall into disrepair.

French Jesuits extended and converted the building to become a theologate, which opened in 1906. Amongst the students there was Pierre Teilhard de Chardin from 1908-1912. The learning centre had 20,000 books and could accommodate 100 students and continued to be used until 1926.

During World War II the building was requisitioned for the Royal Army Service Corps for use as a records office. Military use continued after the war, with the Army Catering Corps records department joining the RASC in April 1947.

The Victorian house was demolished in 1987.
