= The Phenomenon of Man =

1955 book by Pierre Teilhard de Chardin

- Author: Pierre Teilhard de Chardin
- Original title: Le phénomène humain
- Translator: Bernard Wall
- Language: French
- Subjects: Cosmology, Evolution, Philosophical anthropology
- Publisher: Éditions du Seuil (France); Harper & Brothers (US); William Collins (UK)
- Publication date: 1955
- Publication place: France
- English publication date: 1959
- Media type: Print
- Pages: 347 (French); 318 (English)
- LC Class: BD512.T413

The Phenomenon of Man (French: Le phénomène humain) is an essay by the French geologist, paleontologist, philosopher, and Jesuit priest Pierre Teilhard de Chardin. In this work, Teilhard describes evolution as a process that leads to increasing complexity, culminating in the unification of consciousness. The text was written in the 1930s, but it achieved publication only posthumously, in 1955.

In depth, the work seeks to unify multiple scientific fields, as per the author's multidisciplinary approach in his own career, with the principles of religion and broader human understandings of existence into a coherent whole. Centering upon biological evolution, Chardin articulates a vision of the universe itself as gradually increasing in complexity and unity from early chaos into ever greater oneness. Drawing upon his devout Christianity, the author argues for a morally idealistic understanding of human nature through which social advancement under the watchful eye of God will eventually lead to a total reconciliation of all things and a final state of absolute collective consciousness, which Chardin titled the "Omega Point". Thus, history's final state will take place such that all of the creatures of the universe exist together with Jesus Christ as the "Logos" or sacred "Word".

The book was initially published to scathing reviews by scientists. The Roman Catholic Church as an institution also distanced itself from Chardin's viewpoints. However, more recent commentary by religious figures such as Pope Benedict XVI have been supportive. Positive reviews have also appeared from popular press such as The New York Times.

== Publication history ==
The essay was written in the 1930s, growing out of a shorter essay with the same title published in 1930. Teilhard prepared it for publication, but he died, on 10 April 1955, before the book appeared. It was published still in the year of his death, with Éditions du Seuil, the publishing house of Catholic intellectual Jean Plaquevent (1901–1965). The essay was printed as prepared by Teilhard, without an introduction by an editor, but with a short preface or avertissement and a short appendix by Teilhard himself, dated March 1947 and October 1948, respectively.

An English translation by Bernard Wall was published in 1959. The foreword to the English version was written by one of the key advocates for natural selection and evolution of the 20th century, and a co-developer of the modern synthesis in biology, Julian Huxley.

A new English edition and translation was published in 1999.

== Summary ==
Teilhard views evolution as a process that leads to increasing complexity. From the cell to the thinking animal, a process of psychical concentration leads to greater consciousness. The emergence of Homo sapiens marks the beginning of a new age, as the power acquired by consciousness to turn in upon itself raises mankind to a new sphere. Borrowing Huxley's expression, Teilhard describes humankind as evolution becoming conscious of itself.

In Teilhard's conception of the evolution of the species, a collective identity begins to develop as trade and the transmission of ideas increases. Knowledge accumulates and is transmitted in increasing levels of depth and complexity. This leads to a further augmentation of consciousness and the emergence of a thinking layer that envelops the Earth. Teilhard calls the new membrane the "noosphere" (from the Greek "nous", meaning mind). The noosphere is the collective consciousness of humanity, the networks of thought and emotion in which all are immersed.

The development of science and technology causes an expansion of the human sphere of influence, allowing a person to be simultaneously present in every corner of the world. Teilhard argues that humanity has thus become cosmopolitan, stretching a single organized membrane over the Earth. Teilhard describes the process by which this happens as a "gigantic psychobiological operation, a sort of mega-synthesis, the ‘super-arrangement’ to which all the thinking elements of the Earth find themselves today individually and collectively subject". The rapid expansion of the noosphere requires a new domain of psychic expansion, which "is staring us in the face if we would only raise our heads to look at it".

In Teilhard's view, evolution will culminate in the Omega Point, a sort of supreme consciousness. Layers of consciousness will converge in Omega, fusing and consuming them in itself. The concentration of a conscious universe will reassemble in itself all consciousnesses as well as all that we are conscious of. Teilhard emphasizes that each individual facet of consciousness will remain conscious of itself at the end of the process.

Fellow scientist and supporter of Teilhard's thought Julian Huxley summarized Teilhard's approach as:

"Before the appearance of man, life consisted of a vast array of separate branches, linked only by an unorganised pattern of ecological interaction. The incipient development of mankind into a single psychosocial unit, with a single... common pool of thought, is providing the evolutionary process with the rudiments of a head. It remains for our descendants to organise this... more adequately, so as to enable mankind to understand the process of evolution on earth more fully and to direct it more adequately... [as] in modern scientific man, evolution was at last becoming conscious of itself[.] [...] Teilhard... implies that [we] should consider inter-thinking humanity as a new type of organism, whose destiny it is to realise new possibilities for evolving life on this planet."

== Reception ==
Julian Huxley in his introduction, dated December 1958, compares Teilhard's idea to his own attempts, published in The Uniqueness of Man (1941) but pursued since before World War I, of unifying humanism and biological evolution as a single process, but separated by a "critical point".

In 1961, Peter Medawar, a British immunologist and Nobel Prize-winner, wrote a scornful review of the book for the journal Mind, calling it "a bag of tricks" and saying that the author had shown "an active willingness to be deceived": "the greater part of it, I shall show, is nonsense, tricked out with a variety of metaphysical conceits, and its author can be excused of dishonesty only on the grounds that before deceiving others he has taken great pains to deceive himself". Richard Dawkins in Unweaving the Rainbow (1998) references Medawar's review as "devastating", and characterises The Phenomenon of Man as "the quintessence of bad poetic science".

Teilhard's publications were viewed with scepticism by the church authorities during his lifetime, and while the Holy Office did not place any of Teilhard's writings on the Index of Forbidden Books at any point, it did publish a monitum or "warning" in 1962, specifically against the then-recent popularity of the posthumously published works by Teilhard:

Several works of Fr. Pierre Teilhard de Chardin, some of which were posthumously published, are being edited and are gaining a good deal of success. Prescinding from a judgement about those points that concern the positive sciences, it is sufficiently clear that the above-mentioned works abound in such ambiguities and indeed even serious errors, as to offend Catholic doctrine. For this reason, the most eminent and most revered Fathers of the Holy Office exhort all Ordinaries as well as the superiors of Religious institutes, rectors of seminaries and presidents of universities, effectively to protect the minds, particularly of the youth, against the dangers presented by the works of Fr. Teilhard de Chardin and of his followers.

Thus, Teilhard's work in the 1960s saw condemnation both on the part of scientists and of church authorities. In an apparent inversion of this, the work has been reviewed approvingly both from the scientific and the theological point of view in more recent years: For the church, Pope Benedict XVI made an approving reference to Teilhard's concept of the Omega Point, in a reflection on the Epistle to the Romans during a vespers service in Aosta Cathedral in 2009. Saying "St. Paul writes that the world itself will one day become a form of living worship", the pope commented on Teilhard:

It's the great vision that later Teilhard de Chardin also had: At the end we will have a true cosmic liturgy, where the cosmos becomes a living host. Let's pray to the Lord that he help us be priests in this sense, to help in the transformation of the world in adoration of God, beginning with ourselves.

Since then, observers have speculated on a possible rescission of the 1962 monitum on the part of Pope Francis.

Teihard's description of consciousness and of the Omega Point has been characterised as prophetic of the information age and the concept of the technological singularity. As early as in 1995, an article in Wired commented that "Teilhard saw the Net coming more than half a century before it arrived":

Teilhard imagined a stage of evolution characterized by a complex membrane of information enveloping the globe and fueled by human consciousness. It sounds a little off-the-wall, until you think about the Net, that vast electronic web encircling the Earth, running point to point through a nerve-like constellation of wires.

Evolutionary biologist David Sloan Wilson in his 2019 This View of Life: Completing the Darwinian Revolution praises Teilhard's book as "scientifically prophetic in many ways", and considers his own work as "an updated version of The Phenomenon of Man.":

== See also ==
- 1955 in literature
- Biological evolution
- Moral idealism
