= Omega Point =

Theoretical future event

The Omega Point is a theorized future event in which the entirety of the universe spirals toward a final point of unification. The term was invented by the French Jesuit Catholic priest Pierre Teilhard de Chardin (1881–1955). Chardin argued that the Omega Point resembles the Christian Logos, namely Christ, who draws all things into himself, who in the words of the Nicene Creed, is "God from God", "Light from Light", "True God from True God", and "through him all things were made". In the Book of Revelation, Christ describes himself three times as "the Alpha and the Omega, the beginning and the end". Several decades after Chardin's death, the idea of the Omega Point was expanded upon in the writings of John David Garcia (1971), Paolo Soleri (1981), Frank Tipler (1994), and David Deutsch (1997).

== Pierre Teilhard de Chardin's theory ==
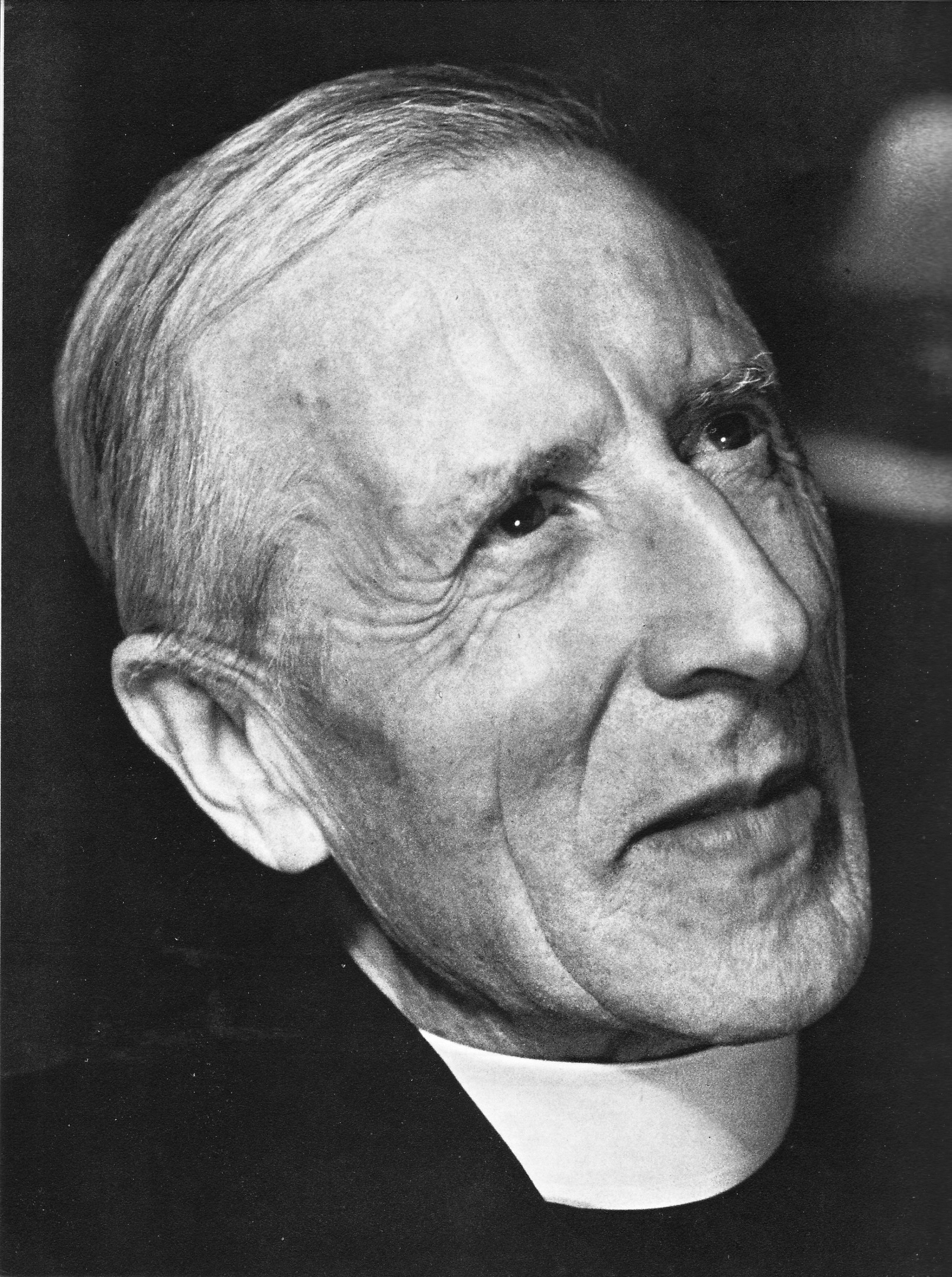
Pierre Teilhard de Chardin, 1947

=== Etymology ===
Teilhard de Chardin was a paleontologist and Roman Catholic priest in the Jesuit order. In France in the 1920s, he began incorporating his theories of the universe into lectures that placed Catholicism and evolution in the same conversation. Because of these lectures, he was suspected by the Holy Office of denying the doctrine of original sin. This caused Chardin to be exiled to China and banned from publication by Church authorities. It was not until one year after his death in 1955 that his writings were published for the world to read. His works were also supported by the writings of a group of Catholic thinkers, which includes Pope Benedict XVI. His book The Phenomenon of Man has been dissected by astrophysicists and cosmologists, and is now viewed as a work positing a theological or philosophical theory that cannot be scientifically proven. Chardin, who was not a cosmologist, opens his books with the statement:

... if this book is to be properly understood, it must be read not as a work on metaphysics, still less as a sort of theological essay, but purely and simply as a scientific treatise.

=== Evolution ===
Chardin maintained that one-cell organisms develop into metazoans or animals, but some of the members of this classification develop organisms with complex nervous systems. This group has the capability to acquire intelligence. When Homo sapiens inhabited Earth through evolution, a noosphere, the cognitive layer of existence, was created. As evolution continues, the noosphere gains coherence. Chardin explained that this noosphere can be moved toward or constructed to be the Omega Point or the final evolutionary stage with the help of science. Chardin refers to this process as "planetization." Eventually, the noosphere gains total dominance over the biosphere and reaches a point of complete independence from tangential energy forming a metaphysical being, called the Omega Point.

=== Energy ===
Energy exists in two basic modes:

1. "Tangential Energy": energy that can be measured by physics.
2. "Radial Energy": spiritual energy which accumulates into a higher state as time progresses.

Chardin defines Radial Energy as becoming more concentrated and available as it is a critical element in man's evolution. The theory applies to all forms of matter, concluding that everything with existence has some sort of life. In regard to Chardin's The Phenomenon of Man, Peter Medawar wrote, "Teilhard's radial, spiritual, or psychic energy may be equated to 'information' or 'information content' in the sense that has been made reasonably precise by communication engineers."

=== Formal properties ===
Chardin's theory is based on four "properties":

1. Humans will escape the heat death of the universe. He theorizes that since radial energy is non-compliant with entropy, it escapes the collapses of forces at world's end.
2. The Omega Point does not exist within the timeline of the universe, it occurs at the exact edge of the end of time. From that point, all sequences of existence are sucked into its being.
3. The Omega Point can be understood as a volume shaped like a cone in which each section, taken from the base to its summit, decreases until it diminishes into a final point.
4. The volume described in the Third Property must be understood as an entity with finite boundaries. Chardin explains:

... what would have become of humanity, if, by some remote chance, it had been free to spread indefinitely on an unlimited surface, that is to say, left only to the devices of its internal affinities? Something unimaginable. ... Perhaps even nothing at all, when we think of the extreme importance of the role played in its development by the forces of compression.

=== Forces of compression ===
Chardin calls the contributing universal energy that generates the Omega Point "forces of compression". Unlike the scientific definition, which incorporates gravity and mass, Chardin's forces of compression are sourced from communication and contact between human beings. This value is limitless and directly correlated with entropy. It suggests that as humans continue to interact, consciousness evolves and grows. For the theory to occur, humans must also be bound to the finite earth. The creation of this boundary forces the world's convergence upon itself which he theorizes to result in time ending in communion with the Omega Point-God. This portion of Chardin's thinking shows his lack of expectation for humans to engage in space travel and transcend the bounds of Earth.

== The Omega Point cosmology ==
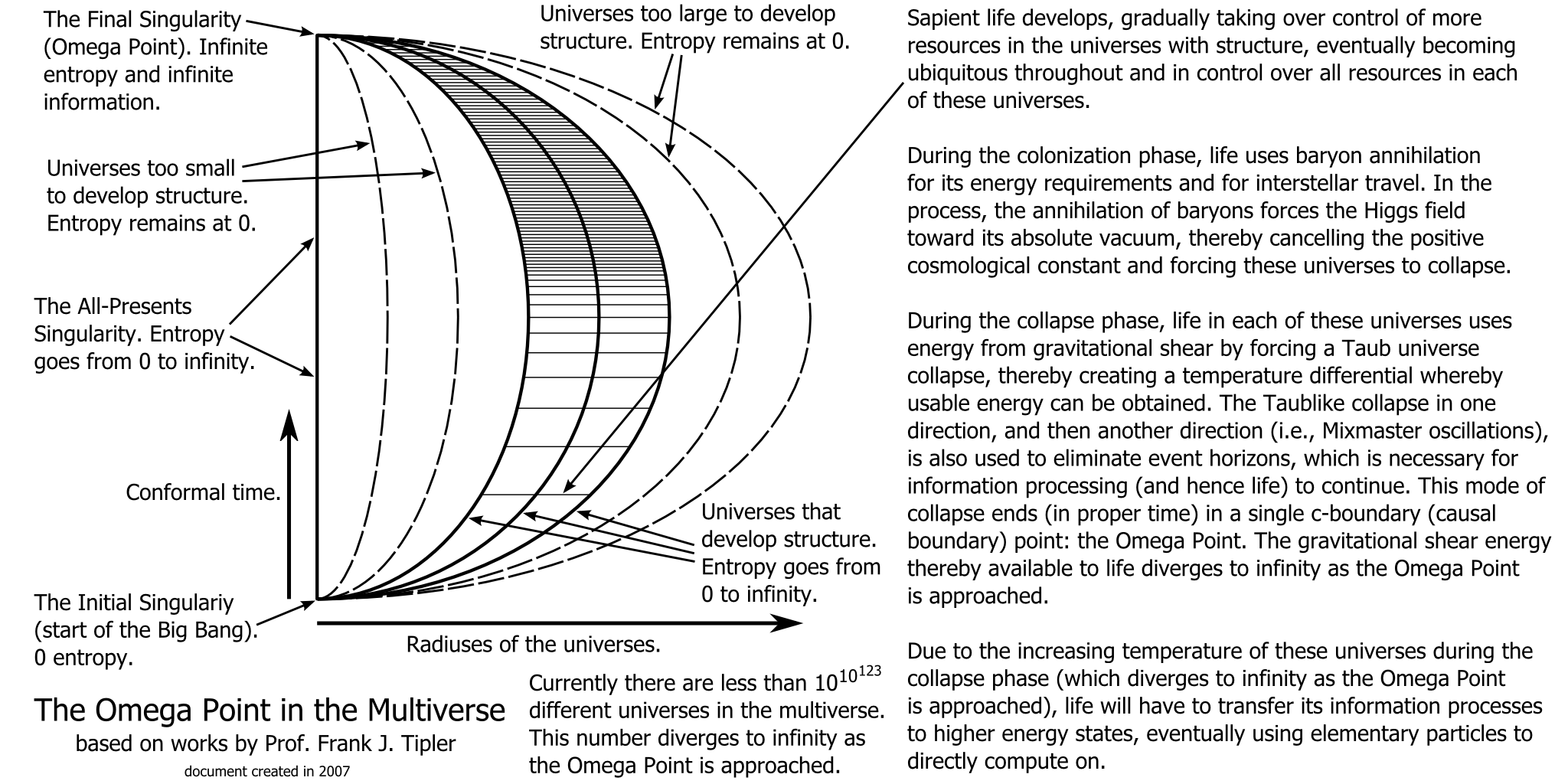
Frank J. Tipler's multiverse theory

Mathematical physicist Frank Tipler generalized Chardin's term Omega Point to describe what he alleges is the ultimate fate of the universe as required by the laws of physics: roughly, Tipler argues that quantum mechanics is inconsistent unless the future of every point in spacetime contains an intelligent observer to collapse the wavefunction and that the only way for this to happen is if the Universe is closed (that is, it will collapse to a single point) and yet contains observers with a "God-like" ability to perform an unbounded series of observations in finite time. Tipler's conception of the Omega Point is regarded as pseudoscience by some scientists.

The originator of quantum computing, Oxford's David Deutsch, wrote about how a universal quantum computer could bring about Tipler's salvation in his 1997 book, The Fabric of Reality.

== Related concepts ==
=== Big Crunch ===
The scientific hypothesis of the Big Crunch closely resembles the Omega Point theory. However, the current scientific consensus rejects this theory. Nevertheless, in 2025, a paper in the journal Monthly Notices appeared suggesting that the universe's expansion is not accelerating, as commonly believed, but slowing, and that it could result in a Big Crunch. This followed another paper earlier in the year reaching similar conclusions.

=== Accelerating expansion of the universe ===
In 1998, a value measured from observations of Type Ia supernovae seemed to indicate that what was once assumed to be temporary cosmological expansion was actually accelerating. The apparent acceleration has caused further dismissal of the validity of Tipler's Omega Point, since the necessity of a final big crunch singularity is key to the Omega Point's workability. However, Tipler believes that the Omega Point is still workable, arguing that a big crunch/ final singularity is still required under many current universal models.

=== Technological singularity ===
The technological singularity is the hypothetical advent of artificial general intelligence becoming capable of recursive self-improvement, resulting in an irreversible machine intelligence explosion, with unknown impact on humanity. Eric Steinhart, a proponent of "Christian transhumanism," argues there is a significant overlap of ideas between the secular singularity and Chardin's religious Omega Point. Steinhart quotes Ray Kurzweil, who stated that "evolution moves inexorably toward our conception of God, albeit never reaching this ideal." Like Kurzweil, Chardin predicted a period of rapid technological change that results in a merger of humanity and technology. He believes that this marks the birth of the noosphere and the emergence of the "spirit of the Earth," but the Teilhardian Singularity comes later. Unlike Kurzweil, Chardin's singularity is marked by the evolution of human intelligence reaching a critical point in which humans ascend from "transhuman" to "posthuman." He identifies this with the Christian "parousia."

== In popular culture ==
The Spanish painter Salvador Dalí was familiar with Teilhard de Chardin's Omega Point theory. His 1959 painting The Ecumenical Council is said to represent the "interconnectedness" of the Omega Point. Point Omega by Don DeLillo takes its name from the theory and involves a character who is studying Chardin. Flannery O'Connor's acclaimed collection of short stories refers to the Omega Point theory in its title, Everything That Rises Must Converge, and science fiction writer Frederik Pohl references Frank Tipler and the Omega Point in his 1998 short story "The Siege of Eternity". Scottish writer / counterculture figure Grant Morrison used the Omega Point as a plot line in several of their Justice League and Batman stories.

Dan Simmons references Chardin and the Omega Point throughout the Hyperion Cantos, with extended discussions about the feasibility of the concept driving much of the plot.

Julian May's Galactic Milieu Series includes multiple references to Chardin, the Omega Point and the Noosphere. Part of the driving force for the Milieu of the title is to promote an increase in the population of various intelligent species, including humans, in order to enable them to reach a point of psychic Unity.

Arthur C. Clarke and Stephen Baxter's The Light of Other Days references Chardin and includes a brief explanation of the Omega Point. Italian writer Valerio Evangelisti used the Omega Point as the main theme of his Il Fantasma di Eymerich novel. In William Peter Blatty's novel The Exorcist, the character Father Merrin references Omega Point. In 2021, Dutch symphonic metal band Epica released their eighth studio album, Omega, which features concepts related to the Omega Point theory. Epica's guitarist and vocalist, Mark Jansen, specifically referenced Chardin's theory when describing the album's concept.

Charles Sheffield's 1997 novel Tomorrow and Tomorrow also uses the concept in the concluding act of the novel.

== See also ==
=== Related concepts ===
- Apokatastasis
- Big Crunch
- Eschatology
- Metasystem transition
- N'Aton
- Noosphere
- Posthuman
- Superintelligence
- Technological singularity
- Transhumanism

=== Related people ===
- Elisabet Sahtouris
- Nikolai Fyodorovich Fyodorov
- Terence McKenna
- Vladimir Vernadsky
- Wolfhart Pannenberg
