= Independent scientist =

Financially independent scientist

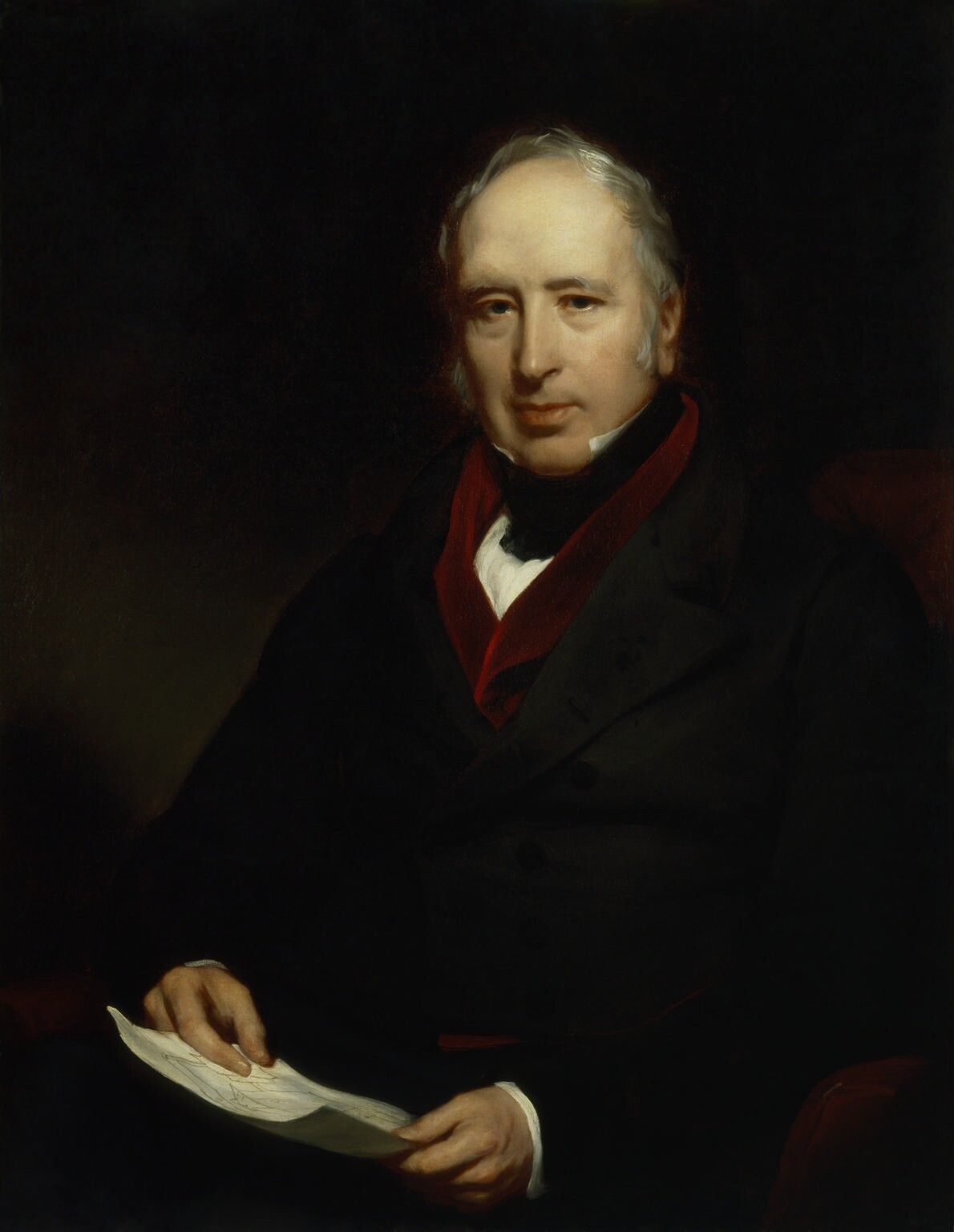
Sir George Cayley, 6th Baronet, discovered fundamental principles of aeronautics.

An independent scientist (historically also known as gentleman scientist) is a financially independent scientist who pursues scientific study without direct affiliation to a public institution such as a university or government-run research and development body.

The term "gentleman scientist" arose in post-Renaissance Europe, but became less common in the 20th century as government and private funding increased.

Most independent scientists have at some point in their career been affiliated with some academic institution, such as Charles Darwin, who was affiliated with the Geological Society of London.

== History ==
Self-funded scientists practiced more commonly from the Renaissance until the late 19th century, including the Victorian era, especially in England, before large-scale government and corporate funding was available. Many early fellows of the Royal Society in London were independent scientists.

=== Modern ===
Modern-day independent scientists who fund their own research on an independent basis include, for example, Stephen Wolfram who funds his research through the sale of Mathematica software, Julian Barbour, Aubrey de Grey, Barrington Moore, Susan Blackmore, James Lovelock, and John Wilkinson who funds his research on "molecular synergism in nature" by running a regulatory scientific consultancy in natural products.

Peter Rich said of Peter D. Mitchell: "I think he would have found it difficult to have gotten funding because his ideas were rather radical." Mitchell went on to win the Nobel Prize in Chemistry in 1978. Chemist Luis Leloir funded the research institute he headed, the Institute for Biochemical Research, in Buenos Aires, Argentina. He won the Nobel Prize for chemistry in 1970.

There are today several virtual research institutes for independent scientists, including the Ronin Institute and the National Coalition of Independent Scholars.

== Notable examples ==
- Annie Montague Alexander
- Mary Anning
- Elizabeth Garrett Anderson
- Aristotle
- Hertha Ayrton
- Charles Babbage
- Julian Barbour
- Robert Boyle
- James Braid
- Mark Catesby
- Henry Cavendish
- John Dalton
- Charles Darwin
- Christopher J. Date
- Robert C. Edgar
- Albert Einstein
- Carlo Fornasini
- Benjamin Franklin
- Goldsworthy Gurney
- Oliver Heaviside
- Caroline Herschel
- Robert Kraichnan
- George Frederick Kunz
- Antoine Lavoisier
- Alfred Lee Loomis
- A. Garrett Lisi
- Ada Lovelace
- James Lovelock
- Gregor Mendel
- Isaac Newton
- Joseph Priestley
- David Rittenhouse
- David E. Shaw
- Alexander Shulgin
- Mary Somerville
- Henry Fox Talbot
- Nikola Tesla
- John Wilkinson (scientist)
- Stephen Wolfram
- Thomas Young
- Lord Salisbury
- Konstantin Eduardovitch Tsiolkovsky

== See also ==
- Citizen science
- Small science and big science

== Sources ==
- Martello, Robert (2000). "The Life and Times of Sir Goldsworthy Gurney: Gentleman Scientist and Inventor, 1793-1875 (review)". Victorian Studies. 42 (4): 688–90. doi:10.1353/vic.1999.0020. S2CID 144758476.
- Porter, Dale H. (1988). The Life and Times of Sir Goldsworthy Gurney, Gentleman Scientist and Inventor, 1793–1875. Lehigh University Press. ISBN 978-0-934223-50-8.
- Cohen, J. (1998). "RESEARCH FUNDING: Scientists Who Fund Themselves". Science. 279 (5348): 178–81. Bibcode:1998Sci...279..178C. doi:10.1126/science.279.5348.178. PMID 9446224. S2CID 10232672.
- Keats, Jonathan (5 December 2007). "Craig Venter is the future". Salon.com. Archived from the original on 7 March 2008.
- Lonsdale, Jon (8 October 2019). "The Rise and Fall of the Gentleman Scientist". Medium.
- Hessler, Angela (17 December 2021). "A path to independence". Science. 374 (6574): 1526. Bibcode:2021Sci...374.1526H. doi:10.1126/science.acx9813. PMID 34914528.
- Madsen, Andreas (9 October 2020). "Becoming an Independent Researcher and getting published in ICLR with spotlight". Medium.
- Madsen, Andreas (23 February 2022). "9 months after my ICLR spotlight award, as an Independent Researcher". Medium.
- Schweitzer, Andrea (8 April 2010). "The path less travelled". Nature. 464 (7290): 945. Bibcode:2010Natur.464..945S. doi:10.1038/nj7290-945a. PMID 20468078.
- Edwards, Rosalind (3 April 2022). "Why do academics do unfunded research? Resistance, compliance and identity in the UK neo-liberal university". Studies in Higher Education. 47 (4): 904–914. doi:10.1080/03075079.2020.1817891. S2CID 225319404.
