= Robert Jay Charlson =

American atmospheric scientist (1936–2021)

Robert Jay Charlson (September 30, 1936 – September 28, 2021) was an American atmospheric scientist, climate scientist, pioneer in the fields of climate forcing and climate change, and coauthor of the CLAW hypothesis. Charlson is known for his research in atmospheric chemistry, aerosol physics, aerosol/cloud/climate interaction, aerosol and cloud instrumentation.

== Background ==
Robert Jay Charlson was born in San Jose, California on September 30, 1936, to Adele and Rolland Charlson. His mother's maiden name was listed as Stucky. On March 16, 1964, he married Patricia Allison in Seattle in the University Christian Church in King County, Washington. Charlson died on September 28, 2021, at the age of 84.

== Education and career ==
Charlson received BS and MS degrees in chemistry from Stanford University. Harold S. Johnston was his undergraduate advisor. His master's thesis was titled: “Techniques for High Speed Flash Photolysis”. In 1964, Charlson was awarded a PhD in atmospheric sciences from the University of Washington, Seattle. His advisor was Konrad Büttner. Since 1998, he was professor emeritus of Atmospheric Sciences, chemistry, and geophysics at the University of Washington in Seattle, Washington.

Charlson was one of the lead authors for Chapter 2, "Radiative forcing of climate change" in the 1995 Intergovernmental Panel on Climate Change (IPCC) working group report. He was also a contributing author to the 1990 and the 2001 IPCC assessment reports. In 2007, the IPCC received the Nobel Peace Prize for this work validating the scientific basis of climate change.

== Selected publications ==
- Charlson, Robert J.; Lovelock, James E.; Andreae, Meinrat O.; Warren, Stephen G. (1987). "Oceanic phytoplankton, atmospheric sulphur, cloud albedo and climate". Nature. 326 (6114): 655–661. Bibcode:1987Natur.326..655C. doi:10.1038/326655a0. ISSN 0028-0836. S2CID 4321239.
- Charlson, R. J.; Schwartz, S. E.; Hales, J. M.; Cess, R. D.; Coakley, J. A.; Hansen, J. E.; Hofmann, D. J. (January 24, 1992). "Climate Forcing by Anthropogenic Aerosols". Science. 255 (5043): 423–430. Bibcode:1992Sci...255..423C. doi:10.1126/science.255.5043.423. ISSN 0036-8075. PMID 17842894. S2CID 26740611.
- Lin, Chin-I; Baker, Marcia; Charlson, Robert J. (June 1, 1973). "Absorption Coefficient of Atmospheric Aerosol: a Method for Measurement". Applied Optics. 12 (6): 1356–1363. Bibcode:1973ApOpt..12.1356L. doi:10.1364/AO.12.001356. ISSN 0003-6935. PMID 20125520.
- Baker, Marcia B.; Charlson, Robert J. (1990). "Bistability of CCN concentrations and thermodynamics in the cloud-topped boundary layer". Nature. 345 (6271): 142–145. Bibcode:1990Natur.345..142B. doi:10.1038/345142a0. ISSN 0028-0836. S2CID 34623897.

== Awards and honors ==
- Stanford University, Honors at entrance
- Phi Lambda Upsilon member
- Stanford University Undergraduate Scholarships, 1955–1958
- Imperial College, London University, Fulbright Scholar, 1964–1965, Cloud Physics.
- NATO Visiting Lectureship in Meteorology, Germany and England, September–October 1969
- Sigma Xi, RESA Regional Lecturer, Pacific Area, 1972–1973; Speaker at Spring 1973 Initiation Meeting, University of Washington
- World Meteorological Association, Gerbier-Mumm Award, (with James Lovelock, Meinrat Andreae and Stephen G. Warren), interdisciplinary scientific paper pertaining to meteorology, 1988
- In 1993, Stockholm University awarded Charlson an honorary doctoral degree, "Hedersdoktor," PhDh.c.
- American Meteorological Society, fellow, 1995
- American Geophysical Union, fellow, 1995
- In 1995, as a result of the work Charlson pursued, the journal Science named the sulfate aerosol as one of nine runners-up for Molecule of the Year.
- In 2009, Charlson received the ASLI Choice Award from the Atmospheric Science Librarians International for the work titled: “Clouds in the perturbed climate system: their relationship to energy balance, atmospheric dynamics, and precipitation”. This publication was edited by Jost Heintzenberg and Robert J. Charlson. The award is the highest award and represents ASLI's Choice “for quality, authoritativeness, and comprehensive coverage of new and important aspects of cloud research”.

== Patents ==
- Photon-counting integrating nephelometer. U.S. Patent No. 3,953,127.
- Measurement of the Lidar ratio for atmospheric aerosols using a 180-degree-backscatter nephelometer. U.S. Patent No. 6,404,494.
- Method and apparatus for investigating temporal development of particles or droplets in gas-vapor mixture. U.S. Patent No. 6,766,702.
