= Science policy =

Form of policy

Science policy refers to the use of scientific evidence, expertise, and knowledge to improve policymaking. According to the United Nations, science policy emerges when scientific knowledge is effectively incorporated to inform policymaking, enabling environmental policy to act as a catalyst for transformative change.

Facilitating dialogue between researchers and decision-makers ensure the effective utilisation of research in policymaking. According to the European Commission, "By integrating science into policymaking, governments can create policies that are more effective, evidence-based, and aligned with the needs of society."

Graphical summary of a position paper on proposed changes to science policy in the Netherlands around academic incentive and reward structures

Other aspects of science policy can include the allocation of resources for the conduct of science towards the goal of best serving the public interest. Topics include the funding of science, the careers of scientists, and the translation of scientific discoveries into technological innovation to promote commercial product development, competitiveness, economic growth and economic development. Science policy focuses on knowledge production and role of knowledge networks, collaborations, and the complex distributions of expertise, equipment, and know-how. Understanding the processes and organizational context of generating novel and innovative science and engineering ideas is a core concern of science policy. Science policy topics include weapons development, health care and environmental monitoring.

Science policy thus deals with the entire domain of issues that involve science, policy advise and policy making to influence policy decisions on a large scale. A complex web of factors influences the development of science and engineering that includes government science policymakers, private firms (including both national and multi-national firms), social movements, media, non-governmental organizations, universities, and other research institutions. In addition, science policy is increasingly international as defined by the global operations of firms and research institutions as well as by the collaborative networks of non-governmental organizations and of the nature of scientific inquiry itself.

== History ==
State policy has influenced the funding of public works and science for thousands of years, dating at least from the time of the Mohists, who inspired the study of logic during the period of the Hundred Schools of Thought, and the study of defensive fortifications during the Warring States period in China. General levies of labor and grain were collected to fund great public works in China, including the accumulation of grain for distribution in times of famine, for the building of levees to control flooding by the great rivers of China, for the building of canals and locks to connect rivers of China, some of which flowed in opposite directions to each other, and for the building of bridges across these rivers. These projects required a civil service, the scholars, some of whom demonstrated great mastery of hydraulics.

In Italy, Galileo noted that individual taxation of minute amounts could fund large sums to the State, which could then fund his research on the trajectory of cannonballs, noting that "each individual soldier was being paid from coin collected by a general tax of pennies and farthings, while even a million of gold would not suffice to pay the entire army."

In Great Britain, Lord Chancellor Sir Francis Bacon had a formative effect on science policy with his identification of "experiments of ... light, more penetrating into nature [than what others know]", which today we call the crucial experiment. Governmental approval of the Royal Society recognized a scientific community which exists to this day. British prizes for research spurred the development of an accurate, portable chronometer, which directly enabled reliable navigation and sailing on the high seas, and also funded Babbage's computer.

The professionalization of science, begun in the nineteenth century, was partly enabled by the creation of scientific organizations such as the National Academy of Sciences, the Kaiser Wilhelm Institute, and State funding of universities of their respective nations. In the United States, a member of the National Academy of Sciences can sponsor a Direct Submission for publication in the Proceedings of the National Academy of Sciences. PNAS serves as a channel to recognize research of importance to at least one member of the National Academy of Sciences.

Public policy can directly affect the funding of capital equipment, intellectual infrastructure for industrial research, by providing tax incentives to those organizations who fund research. Vannevar Bush, director of the office of scientific research and development for the U.S. government in July 1945, wrote "Science is a proper concern of government" Vannevar Bush directed the forerunner of the National Science Foundation, and his writings directly inspired researchers to invent the hyperlink and the computer mouse. The DARPA initiative to support computing was the impetus for the Internet Protocol stack. In the same way that scientific consortiums like CERN for high-energy physics have a commitment to public knowledge, access to this public knowledge in physics led directly to CERN's sponsorship of development of the World Wide Web and standard Internet access for all.

== Philosophies ==
=== Basic versus applied research ===
The programs that are funded are often divided into four basic categories: basic research, applied research, development, and facilities and equipment. Translational research is a newer concept that seeks to bridge the gap between basic science and practical applications.

Basic science attempts to stimulate breakthroughs. Breakthroughs often lead to an explosion of new technologies and approaches. Once the basic result is developed, it is widely published; however conversion into a practical product is left for the free market. However, many governments have developed risk-taking research and development organizations to take basic theoretical research over the edge into practical engineering. In the US, this function is performed by DARPA.

In contrast, technology development is a policy in which engineering, the application of science, is supported rather than basic science. The emphasis is usually given to projects that increase important strategic or commercial engineering knowledge. One example is the Manhattan Project that developed nuclear weapons. Another example is the "X-vehicle" studies that gave the US a lasting lead in aerospace technologies.

These exemplify two disparate approaches: The Manhattan Project was huge, and spent freely on the most risky alternative approaches. The project members believed that failure would result in their enslavement or destruction by Nazi Germany. Each X-project built an aircraft whose only purpose was to develop a particular technology. The plan was to build a few cheap aircraft of each type, fly a test series, often to the destruction of an aircraft, and never design an aircraft for a practical mission. The only mission was technology development.

A number of high-profile technology developments have failed. The US Space Shuttle failed to meet its cost or flight schedule goals. Most observers explain the project as over constrained: the cost goals too aggressive, the technology and mission too underpowered and undefined.

The Japanese fifth generation computer systems project met every technological goal, but failed to produce commercially important artificial intelligence. Many observers believe that the Japanese tried to force engineering beyond available science by brute investment. Half the amount spent on basic research rather might have produced ten times the result.

=== Utilitarian versus monumental policy ===
Utilitarian policies prioritize scientific projects that significantly reduce suffering for larger numbers of people. This approach would mainly consider the numbers of people that can be helped by a research policy. Research is more likely to be supported when it costs less and has greater benefits. Utilitarian research often pursues incremental improvements rather than dramatic advancements in knowledge, or break-through solutions, which are more commercially viable.

In contrast, monumental science is a policy in which science is supported for the sake of a greater understanding of the universe, rather than for specific short-term practical goals. This designation covers both large projects, often with large facilities, and smaller research that does not have obvious practical applications and are often overlooked. While these projects may not always have obvious practical outcomes, they provide education of future scientists, and advancement of scientific knowledge of lasting worth about the basic building blocks of science.

Practical outcomes do result from many of these "monumental" science programs. Sometimes these practical outcomes are foreseeable and sometimes they are not. A classic example of a monumental science program focused towards a practical outcome is the Manhattan Project. An example of a monumental science program that produces unexpected practical outcomes is the laser. Coherent light, the principle behind lasing, was first predicted by Einstein in 1916, but not created until 1954 by Charles H. Townes with the maser. The breakthrough with the maser led to the creation of the laser in 1960 by Theodore Maiman. The delay between the theory of coherent light and the production of the laser was partially due to the assumption that it would be of no practical use.

=== Scholastic conservation ===
This policy approach prioritizes efficiently teaching all available science to those who can use it, rather than investing in new science. In particular, the goal is not to lose any existing knowledge, and to find new practical ways to apply the available knowledge. The classic examples of this method occurred in the 19th century US land-grant universities, which established a strong tradition of research in practical agricultural and engineering methods. More recently, the Green Revolution prevented mass famine over the last thirty years. The focus is usually on developing a robust curriculum and inexpensive practical methods to meet local needs.

== By country ==
Most developed countries usually have a specific national body overseeing national science (including technology and innovation) policy. Many developing countries follow the same fashion. Many governments of developed countries provide considerable funds (primarily to universities) for scientific research (in fields such as physics and geology) as well as social science research (in fields such as economics and history). Much of this is not intended to provide concrete results that may be commercialisable, although research in scientific fields may lead to results that have such potential. Most university research is aimed at gaining publication in peer reviewed academic journals.

A funding body is an organization that provides research funding in the form of research grants or scholarships. Research councils are funding bodies that are government-funded agencies engaged in the support of research in different disciplines and postgraduate funding. Funding from research councils is typically competitive. As a general rule, more funding is available in science and engineering disciplines than in the arts and social sciences.

=== Australia ===
In Australia, the two main research councils are the Australian Research Council and the National Health and Medical Research Council.

=== Canada ===
In Canada, the three main research councils ("Tri-Council") are the Social Sciences and Humanities Research Council (SSHRC) the Natural Sciences and Engineering Research Council (NSERC) and the Canadian Institutes of Health Research (CIHR). Additional research funding agencies include the Canada Foundation for Innovation, Genome Canada, Sustainable Development Technology Canada, Mitacs and several Tri-Council supported Networks of Centres of Excellence.

=== Brazil ===
In Brazil, two important research agencies are the National Council for Scientific and Technological Development (CNPq, Portuguese: Conselho Nacional de Desenvolvimento Científico e Tecnológico), an organization of the Brazilian federal government under the Ministry of Science and Technology, and São Paulo Research Foundation (FAPESP, Portuguese: Fundação de Amparo à Pesquisa do Estado de São Paulo), a public foundation located in the state of São Paulo, Brazil.

=== European Union ===
The science policy of the European Union is carried out through the European Research Area, a system which integrates the scientific resources of member nations and acts as a "common market" for research and innovation. The European Union's executive body, the European Commission, has a Directorate-General for Research, which is responsible for the Union's science policy. In addition, the Joint Research Centre provides independent scientific and technical advice to the European Commission and Member States of the European Union (EU) in support of EU policies. There is also the recently established European Research Council, the first European Union funding body set up to support investigator-driven research.

There are also European science agencies that operate independently of the European Union, such as the European Space Agency, and the European Higher Education Area, created by the Bologna process.

The European environmental research and innovation policy addresses global challenges of pivotal importance for the well-being of European citizens within the context of sustainable development and environmental protection. Research and innovation in Europe is financially supported by the programme Horizon 2020, which is also open to participation worldwide.

=== Germany ===
German research funding agencies include the Deutsche Forschungsgemeinschaft, which covers both science and humanities.

=== India ===
Research funding by the Government of India comes from a number of sources. For basic science and technology research, these include the Council for Scientific and Industrial Research (CSIR), Department of Science and Technology (DST), and University Grants Commission (UGC). For medical research, these include the Indian Council for Medical Research (ICMR), CSIR, DST and Department of Biotechnology (DBT). For applied research, these include the CSIR, DBT and Science and Engineering Research Council (SERC).

Other funding authorities include the Defence Research Development Organisation (DRDO), the Indian Council of Agricultural Research (ICAR), the Indian Space Research Organisation (ISRO), the Department of Ocean Development (DOD), the Indian Council for Social Science Research (ICSSR), and the Ministry of Environment and Forests (MEF).

=== Ireland ===
Irish funding councils include the Irish Research Council (IRC) and the Science Foundation Ireland. The prior Irish Research Council for Science, Engineering and Technology (IRCSET) and the Irish Research Council for the Humanities and Social Sciences (IRCHSS) were merged to form the IRC in March 2012.

=== Netherlands ===
Dutch research funding agencies include Nederlandse Organisatie voor Wetenschappelijk Onderzoek (NWO) and Agentschap NL. In 2016, the Netherlands began trials for Self-Organized Funding Allocation (SOFA), a novel method of distributing research funds which proponents believe may have advantages compared to the grant system.

=== Pakistan ===
The Government of Pakistan has mandated that a certain percentage of gross revenue generated by all telecom service providers be allocated to development and research of information and communication technologies. The National ICT R&D Fund was established in January 2007.

=== Russia ===
Under the Soviet Union, much research was routinely suppressed. Now science in Russia is supported by state and private funds. From the state, funding institutions include the Russian Humanitarian Scientific Foundation (www.rfh.ru), the Russian Foundation for Basic Research (www.rfbr.ru), and the Russian Science Foundation (rscf.ru).

=== Sri Lanka ===
Science and Technology Policy Research Division (STPRD) of the National Science Foundation (NSF), which was established as a statutory body, through an Act of the Parliament of Sri Lanka, is engaged in providing evidence based policy recommendations for policy formulation on science, technology and other fields ensuring the research/innovation eco-system of the country. Accordingly, the Division undertake science, technology and innovation policy research in the areas of importance to make recommendations for policy formulation.

Besides NSF, the national experts, researchers, public universities and non-governmental bodies like National Academy of Sciences of Sri Lanka (NASSL), also provides expert advice on policy matters to the Government.

=== Switzerland ===
Swiss research funding agencies include the Swiss National Science Foundation (SNSF), the innovation promotion agency CTI (CTI/KTI), Ressortforschung des Bundes, and Eidgenössische Stiftungsaufsicht. The Geneva Science-Policy Interface foster the contribution of scientific actors in multilateral governance processes and support science-informed policies on global challenges.

=== United Kingdom ===
The Department for Science, Innovation and Technology (DSIT) is the ministerial department of the government of the United Kingdom responsible for helping to encourage, develop and manage the United Kingdom's scientific, research, and technological outputs. Additionally, the Government Office for Science advises the Government on policy and decision-making based on science and long-term thinking.

In the UK, the Haldane principle that decisions about what to spend research funds on should be made by researchers rather than politicians is still influential in research policy. UK Research and Innovation is a non-departmental public body that directs research and innovation funding in accordance with this principle. The Advanced Research and Invention Agency is an additional body which was set up to fund high-risk, high-reward research.

=== United States ===
The United States has a long history of government support for science and technology. Science policy in the United States is the responsibility of many organizations throughout the federal government. Much of the large-scale policy is made through the legislative budget process of enacting the yearly federal budget. Further decisions are made by the various federal agencies which spend the funds allocated by Congress, either on in-house research or by granting funds to outside organizations and researchers.

Research funding agencies in the United States are spread among many different departments, which include:

- Defense Advanced Research Projects Agency (DARPA)
- United States Department of Energy Office of Science
- National Institutes of Health: biomedical research
- National Science Foundation: fundamental research and education in all the non-medical fields of science and engineering.
- Office of Naval Research

== See also ==
- Big science
- Evidence-based policy
- Funding bias
- Funding of science
- History of military science
- History of science policy
- Intellectual property policy
- List of books about the politics of science
- List of funding opportunity databases
- Metascience
- Open access
- Operations research
- Office of Science and Technology Policy
- Patent
- Politicization of science
- Right to science and culture
- Science of science policy
