= Novacene =

2019 book by James Lovelock

- First edition
- Author: James Lovelock (with Bryan Appleyard)
- Language: English
- Subject: Environmentalism; Superintelligence
- Genre: Non-fiction
- Publisher: Penguin Books Limited
- Publication date: July 4, 2019
- Publication place: United Kingdom
- Media type: Hardcover
- Pages: 160
- ISBN: 9780241399361

Novacene: The Coming Age of Hyperintelligence is a 2019 non-fiction book by scientist and environmentalist James Lovelock. It has been published by Penguin Books/Allen Lane in the UK, and republished by the MIT Press. The book was co-authored by journalist Bryan Appleyard. It predicts that a benevolent eco-friendly artificial superintelligence will someday become the dominant lifeform on the planet and argues humanity is on the brink of a new era: the Novacene.

== Content and ideas ==
=== Part One: The Knowing Cosmos ===
==== The Gaia system ====
Lovelock builds upon his Gaia hypothesis, wherein he sees Earth's systems as well as the organisms on it as one cooperating superorganism. This system, Gaia, regulates and protects itself against external threats, such as an increasing heat output from the sun or asteroids. Another assertion of the hypothesis is that Gaia has an (unintentional) evolutionary strategy to sustain itself by sprouting life capable of countering said hazards. Lovelock also sketches the development of life, first anaerobic and then aerobic. He further articulates the central role of sunlight in evolution's progress via three stages:

- Sunlight's energy being converted into chemical energy necessary for life
- Sunlight's energy into physical energy via engines using coal or fossil fuels
- Sunlight's energy into information via computers and their ability to control electrons

==== Intuition and reason ====
Lovelock also articulates his views that reason is overvalued compared to intuition, arguing that step-by-step logic cannot explain all mechanisms. According to Lovelock, human language is a curse that forces causal and linear vertical thinking at the expense of intuition.

=== Part Two: The Age of Fire ===
==== Anthropocene to Novacene ====
Lovelock discusses that the Anthropocene, a proposed geological epoch characterized by human ability to greatly shape the environment to fit man's needs, starts in 1712, after the invention of the Newcomen atmospheric engine, a vital catalyst for the later Industrial Revolution. Lovelock proposes a successor to the Anthropocene dubbed the Novacene, an epoch that will see the rise of super-intelligent robotic agents (referred to as 'cyborgs' by Lovelock). These electronic lifeforms would be capable of thinking exponentially more quickly than humans and would also mould their surroundings for sustenance.

==== Markets as driving factor ====
Lovelock emphasizes that the evolution of the Anthropocene was propelled by market forces, stressing that profitability is a crucial feature of inventions such as Newcomen's steam engine. Economic significance of technologies ensures their development.

=== Part Three: Into the Novacene ===
==== Life with cyborgs ====
Cyborgs would be intelligent enough to rapidly improve themselves and correct faults, much like Darwinian selection, but moreso a form of intentional selection, superior to evolution's slow and arbitrary natural selection. Self-learning AI agents are mentioned, under which Deepmind's AlphaZero, which taught itself chess by playing against itself. In combination with rapid processing speed, they would greatly surpass human intelligence; in Lovelock's words, they may see us the way we see plants: passive and slow. He further mentions these cyborgs may tap into natural resources for their sustenance, much like plants and animals rely on sunlight through photosynthesis or energy stored in organic food such as fruits.

==== Benevolent cyborgs ====
Lovelock argues a future AI takeover will save both the planet and the human race from catastrophic climate change: the cyborgs will recognize the danger of global heating themselves and act to stop the warming of the planet. Contrary to Max Tegmark and others who fear existential risk from advanced artificial intelligence, Lovelock argues that robots will need organic life to keep the planet from overheating, and that therefore robots will want to keep humanity alive, perhaps as pets. Lovelock goes on to argue that humans might be happier under robotic domination.

==== Contra autonomous warfare ====
In regards to more primitive technology, Lovelock condemns the concept of autonomous weapon systems capable of killing without human interference. The scientist also expresses his horror regarding nuclear weapons, but remains a proponent of nuclear energy itself.

== Reception ==
In Nature, science journalist Tim Radford praises both Lovelock's career and the book, stating that Novacene and Lovelock's other books are "written persuasively". Radford reserves judgement on whether Lovelock's predictions will come true. In The Guardian, author Steven Poole also praises the writing style, but believes that despite Lovelock's "speculation" there may remain "reasonable cause for alarm" in the event of an AI takeover. He also dismisses Lovelock's "ropey" criticism of logical reasoning, but overall considers Lovelock's "infectious, almost absurdist optimism" a welcome relief from environmental techno-pessimism. In The Daily Telegraph, journalist Roger Lewis gives only two out of five stars to Lovelock's "rambling optimism". Skeptics have categorized Lovelock's predictions as overconfident.

== In popular culture ==
The speculative fiction thriller Rise of the Water Margin touches on many of the themes presented in Novacene, including Gaia hypothesis and superintelligence. The author mentions James Lovelock in the body of the story and Novacene in the credits and thanks.

== See also ==
- Anthropic Cosmological Principle – Hypothesis about sapient life and the universe
- Gaia hypothesis – Scientific hypothesis about Earth
- Artificial superintelligence – Hypothetical agent surpassing human intelligence
