= James Lovelock =

English scientist (1919–2022)

James Lovelock CH CBE FRS
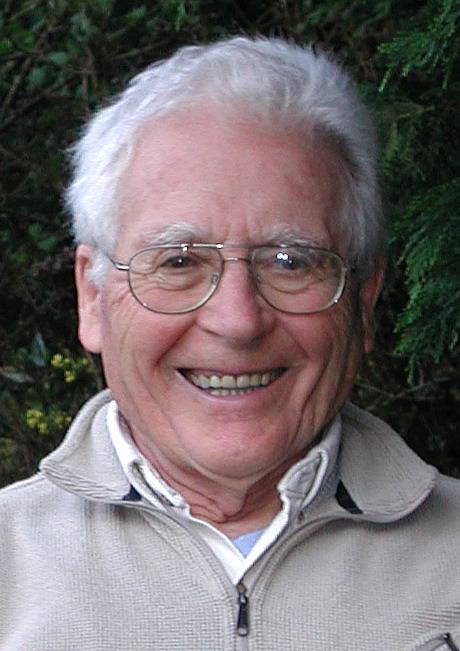
- Lovelock in 2005
- Born: James Ephraim Lovelock; 26 July 1919; Letchworth, Hertfordshire, England
- Died: 26 July 2022 (aged 103); Abbotsbury, Dorset, England
- Education: Victoria University of Manchester (BSc); London School of Hygiene & Tropical Medicine (PhD)
- Known for: Electron capture detector; Gaia hypothesis
- Spouses: Helen Hyslop (m. 1942; died 1989) Sandy Orchard (m. 1991)
- Children: 4
- Awards: See list: Dr A. H. Heineken Prize for Environmental Sciences (1990); Commander of the Order of the British Empire (1990); Volvo Environment Prize (1996); Companion of Honour (2003); Wollaston Medal (2006)
- Scientific career
- Fields: Chemistry; earth science
- Workplaces: Independent scientist; Yale University; Baylor College of Medicine; Harvard Medical School
- Thesis: The properties and use of aliphatic and hydroxy carboxylic acids in aerial disinfection (1947)
- Website: Official website

James Ephraim Lovelock (26 July 1919 – 26 July 2022) was an English independent scientist, environmentalist and futurist. He is best known for proposing the Gaia hypothesis, which postulates that the Earth functions as a self-regulating system.

With a PhD in the chemistry of disinfection, Lovelock began his career performing cryopreservation experiments on rodents, including successfully thawing and reviving frozen specimens. His methods were influential in the theories of cryonics (the cryopreservation of humans). He invented the electron capture detector and, using it, became the first to detect the widespread presence of chlorofluorocarbons in the atmosphere. While designing scientific instruments for NASA, he developed the Gaia hypothesis.

In the 2000s, he proposed a method of climate engineering to restore carbon dioxide–consuming algae. He was an outspoken member of Environmentalists for Nuclear Energy, asserting that fossil fuel interests have been behind opposition to nuclear energy, citing the effects of carbon dioxide as being harmful to the environment and warning of global warming due to the greenhouse effect. He wrote several environmental science books based upon the Gaia hypothesis from the late 1970s.

He also worked for MI5, the British security service, for decades. Bryan Appleyard, writing in The Sunday Times, described him as "basically Q in the James Bond films".

== Early life and education ==
James Lovelock was born in Letchworth Garden City to Tom Arthur Lovelock and his second wife Nellie. Nell, his mother, was born in Bermondsey and won a scholarship to a grammar school but was unable to take it up, and started work at thirteen in a pickle factory. She was described by Lovelock as a socialist and suffragist, who was also anti-vaccine, and did not allow Lovelock to receive his smallpox inoculation as a child. His father, Tom, was born in Fawley, Berkshire, had served six months hard labour for poaching in his teens, and was illiterate until attending technical college, later running a bookshop. Lovelock was brought up a Quaker and imbued with the notion that "God is a still, small voice within rather than some mysterious old gentleman way out in the universe", which he thought was a helpful way of thinking for inventors, but he would eventually end up as being non-religious. The family moved to London, where his dislike of authority made him, by his own account, an unhappy pupil at Strand School in Tulse Hill, south London.

Lovelock could not at first afford to go to university, something which he believed helped prevent him from becoming overspecialised and aided the development of Gaia theory.

== Career ==
After leaving school Lovelock worked at a photography firm, attending Birkbeck College during the evenings, before being accepted to study chemistry at the University of Manchester, where he was a student of the Nobel Prize laureate professor Alexander R. Todd. Lovelock worked at a Quaker farm before a recommendation from his professor led to him taking up a Medical Research Council post, working on ways of shielding soldiers from burns. Lovelock refused to use the shaved and anaesthetised rabbits that were used as burn victims, and exposed his skin to heat radiation instead, an experience he describes as "exquisitely painful". His student status enabled temporary deferment of military service during the Second World War. Still, he registered as a conscientious objector. He later abandoned his conscientious objection in the light of Nazi atrocities and tried to enlist in the armed forces but was told that his medical research was too valuable for the enlistment to be approved.

In 1948, Lovelock received a PhD degree at the London School of Hygiene and Tropical Medicine. He spent the next two decades working at London's National Institute for Medical Research. In the United States, he conducted research at Yale, Baylor College of Medicine and Harvard University Medical School.

In the mid-1950s, Lovelock experimented with the cryopreservation of rodents, determining that hamsters could be frozen and revived successfully. Hamsters were frozen with 60% of the water in the brain crystallised into ice with no adverse effects recorded. Other organs were shown to be susceptible to damage.

A lifelong inventor, Lovelock created and developed many scientific instruments, some of which were designed for NASA in its planetary exploration program. While working as a NASA consultant, Lovelock developed the Gaia hypothesis, for which he is most widely known.

In early 1961, Lovelock was engaged by NASA to develop sensitive instruments for the analysis of extraterrestrial atmospheres and planetary surfaces. The Viking program, which visited Mars in the late 1970s, was motivated in part to determine whether Mars supported life, and some of the sensors and experiments that were ultimately deployed aimed to resolve this issue. During work on a precursor of this program, Lovelock became interested in the composition of the Martian atmosphere, reasoning that many life forms on Mars would be obliged to make use of it (and, thus, alter it). However, the atmosphere was found to be in a stable condition close to its chemical equilibrium, with very little oxygen, methane, or hydrogen, but with an overwhelming abundance of carbon dioxide. To Lovelock, the stark contrast between the Martian atmosphere and chemically dynamic mixture of the Earth's biosphere was strongly indicative of the absence of life on Mars. However, when they were finally launched to Mars, the Viking probes still searched (unsuccessfully) for extant life there. Further experiments to search for life on Mars have been carried out by additional space probes, for instance, by NASA's Perseverance rover, which landed in 2021.

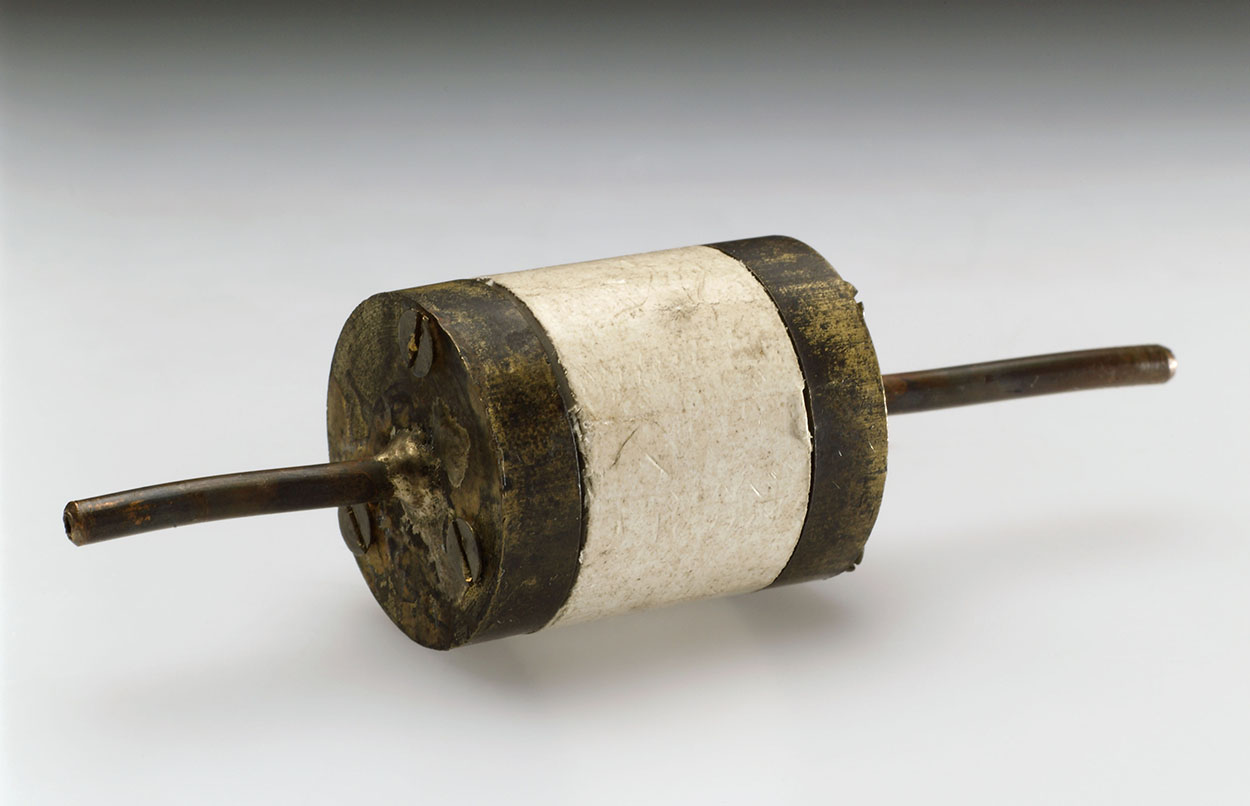
Electron capture detector developed by Lovelock in the Science Museum, London

Lovelock invented the electron capture detector, which ultimately assisted in discoveries about the persistence of chlorofluorocarbons (CFCs) and their role in stratospheric ozone depletion. After studying the operation of the Earth's sulphur cycle, Lovelock and his colleagues, Robert Jay Charlson, Meinrat Andreae and Stephen G. Warren developed the CLAW hypothesis as a possible example of biological control of the Earth's climate.

Lovelock was elected a Fellow of the Royal Society in 1974. He served as the president of the Marine Biological Association (MBA) from 1986 to 1990 and was an Honorary Visiting Fellow of Green Templeton College, Oxford (formerly Green College, Oxford) from 1994.

As an independent scientist, inventor and author, Lovelock worked out of a barn-turned-laboratory he called his "experimental station" located in a wooded valley on the Devon–Cornwall border in South West England.

In 1988 he made an extended appearance on the Channel 4 television programme After Dark, alongside Heathcote Williams and Petra Kelly, among others.

On 8 May 2012, he appeared on the Radio Four series The Life Scientific, talking to Jim Al-Khalili about the Gaia hypothesis. On the programme, he mentioned how his ideas had been received by various people, including Jonathon Porritt. He also said how he had a claim for inventing the microwave oven. He later explained this claim in an interview with The Manchester Magazine. Lovelock said that he did create an instrument during his time studying causes of damage to living cells and tissue, which had, according to him, "almost everything you would expect in an ordinary microwave oven". He invented the instrument to heat frozen hamsters in a way that caused less suffering to the animals, as opposed to the traditional way, which involved putting red-hot spoons on the animals' chests to heat them. He believed that, at the time, nobody had gone that far and made an embodiment of an actual microwave oven. However, he did not claim to have been the first person to have the idea of using microwaves for cooking.

=== CFCs ===
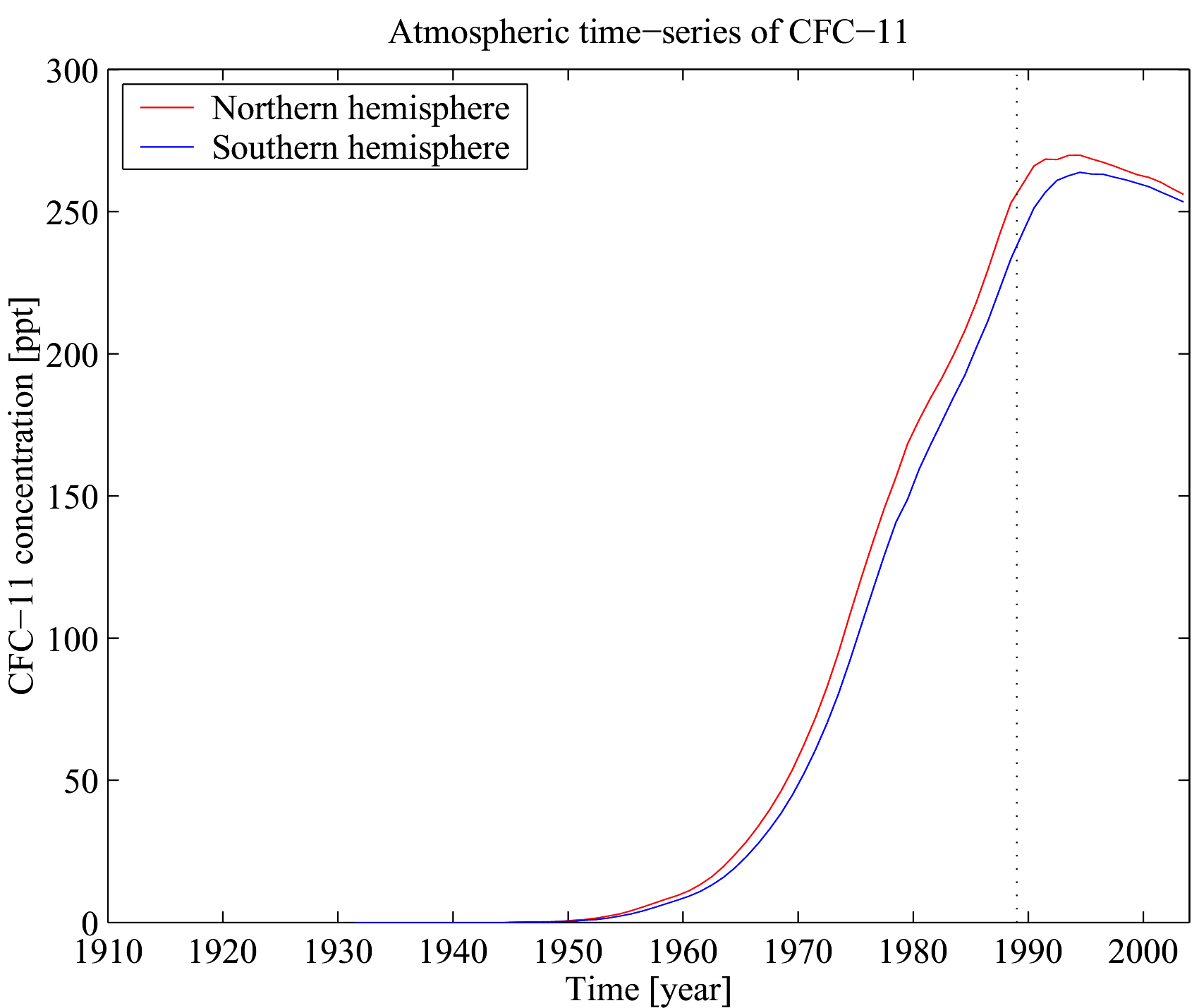
Reconstructed time-series of atmospheric concentrations of CFC-11

After developing his electron capture detector, in the late 1960s, Lovelock was the first to detect the widespread presence of CFCs in the atmosphere. He found a concentration of 60 parts per trillion of CFC-11 over Ireland and, in a partially self-funded research expedition in 1972, went on to measure the concentration of CFC-11 from the northern hemisphere to the Antarctic aboard the research vessel RRS Shackleton. He found the gas in each of the 50 air samples that he collected but, not realising that the breakdown of CFCs in the stratosphere would release chlorine that posed a threat to the ozone layer, concluded that the level of CFCs constituted "no conceivable hazard". He later stated that he meant "no conceivable toxic hazard".

However, the experiment did provide the first useful data on the ubiquitous presence of CFCs in the atmosphere. The damage caused to the ozone layer by the photolysis of CFCs was later discovered by Sherwood Rowland and Mario Molina. After hearing a lecture on the subject of Lovelock's results, they embarked on research that resulted in the first published paper that suggested a link between stratospheric CFCs and ozone depletion in 1974 (for which Sherwood and Molina later shared the 1995 Nobel Prize in Chemistry with Paul Crutzen). Lovelock was sceptical of the CFC–ozone depletion hypothesis for several years, calling the US ban of CFCs as aerosol propellants in the late 1970s arbitrary overkill.

=== Gaia hypothesis ===
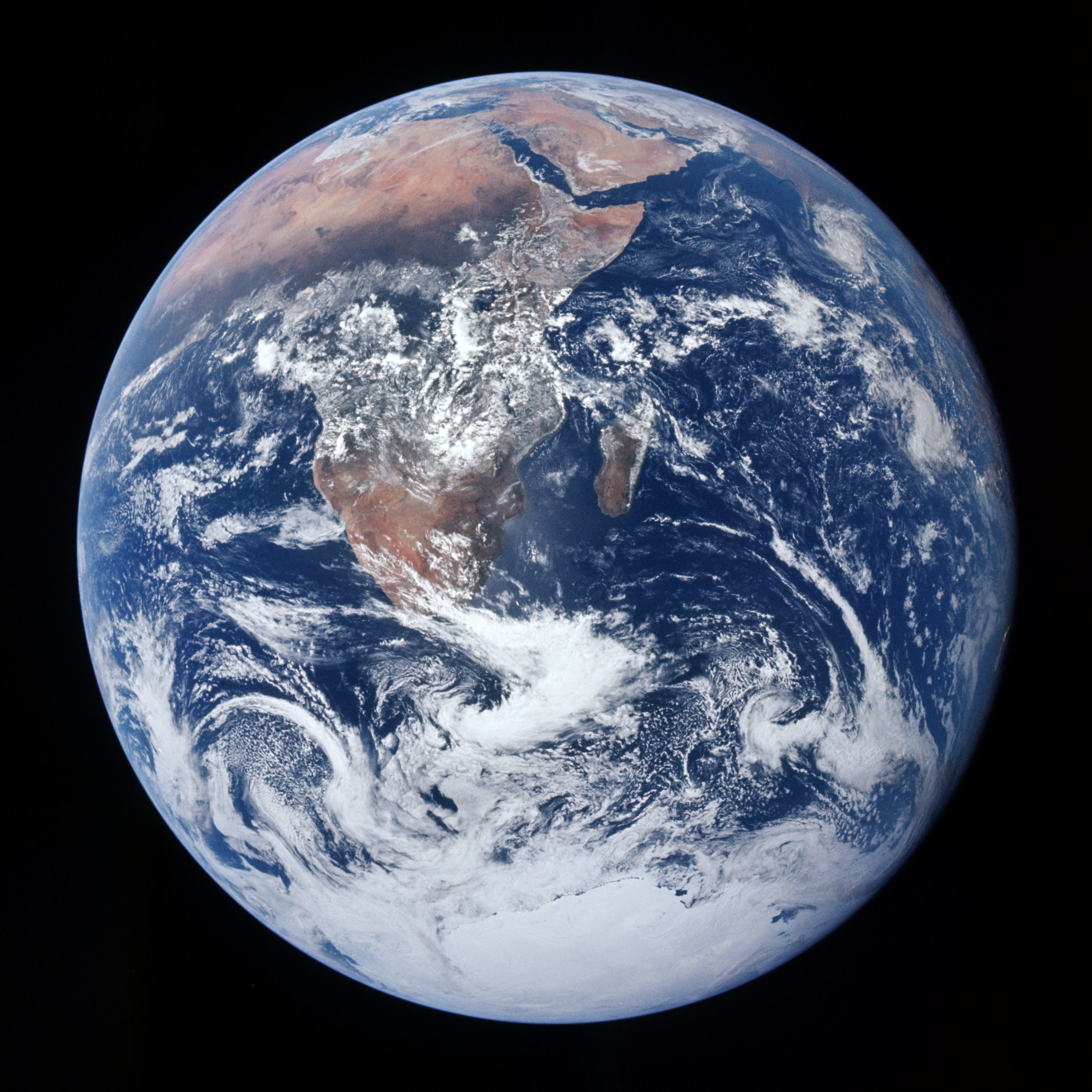
The study of planetary habitability is partly based upon extrapolation from knowledge of the Earth's conditions, as the Earth is the only planet currently known to harbour life (The Blue Marble, 1972 Apollo 17 photograph).

Drawing from the research of Alfred C. Redfield and G. Evelyn Hutchinson, Lovelock first formulated the Gaia hypothesis in the 1960s resulting from his work for NASA concerned with detecting life on Mars and his work with Royal Dutch Shell. The hypothesis proposes that living and non-living parts of the Earth form a complex interacting system that can be thought of as a single organism. Named after the Greek goddess Gaia at the suggestion of novelist William Golding, the hypothesis postulates that the biosphere has a regulatory effect on the Earth's environment that acts to sustain life.

While the hypothesis was readily accepted by many in the environmentalist community, it has not been widely accepted within the scientific community as a whole. Among its most prominent critics were the evolutionary biologists Richard Dawkins, Ford Doolittle and Stephen Jay Gould, a convergence of opinion among a trio whose views on other scientific matters often diverged. These (and other) critics have questioned how natural selection operating on individual organisms can lead to the evolution of planetary-scale homeostasis.

In response to this, Lovelock, together with Andrew Watson, published the computer model Daisyworld in 1983, which postulated a hypothetical planet orbiting a star whose radiant energy is slowly increasing or decreasing. In the non-biological case, the temperature of this planet simply tracks the energy received from the star. However, in the biological case, ecological competition between "daisy" species with different albedo values produces a homeostatic effect on global temperature. When energy received from the star is low, black daisies proliferate since they absorb a greater fraction of the heat, but when energy input is high, white daisies predominate since they reflect excess heat. As the white and black daisies have contrary effects on the planet's overall albedo and temperature, changes in their relative populations stabilise the planet's climate and keep the temperature within an optimal range despite fluctuations in energy from the star. Lovelock argued that Daisyworld, although a parable, illustrates how conventional natural selection operating on individual organisms can still produce planetary-scale homeostasis.

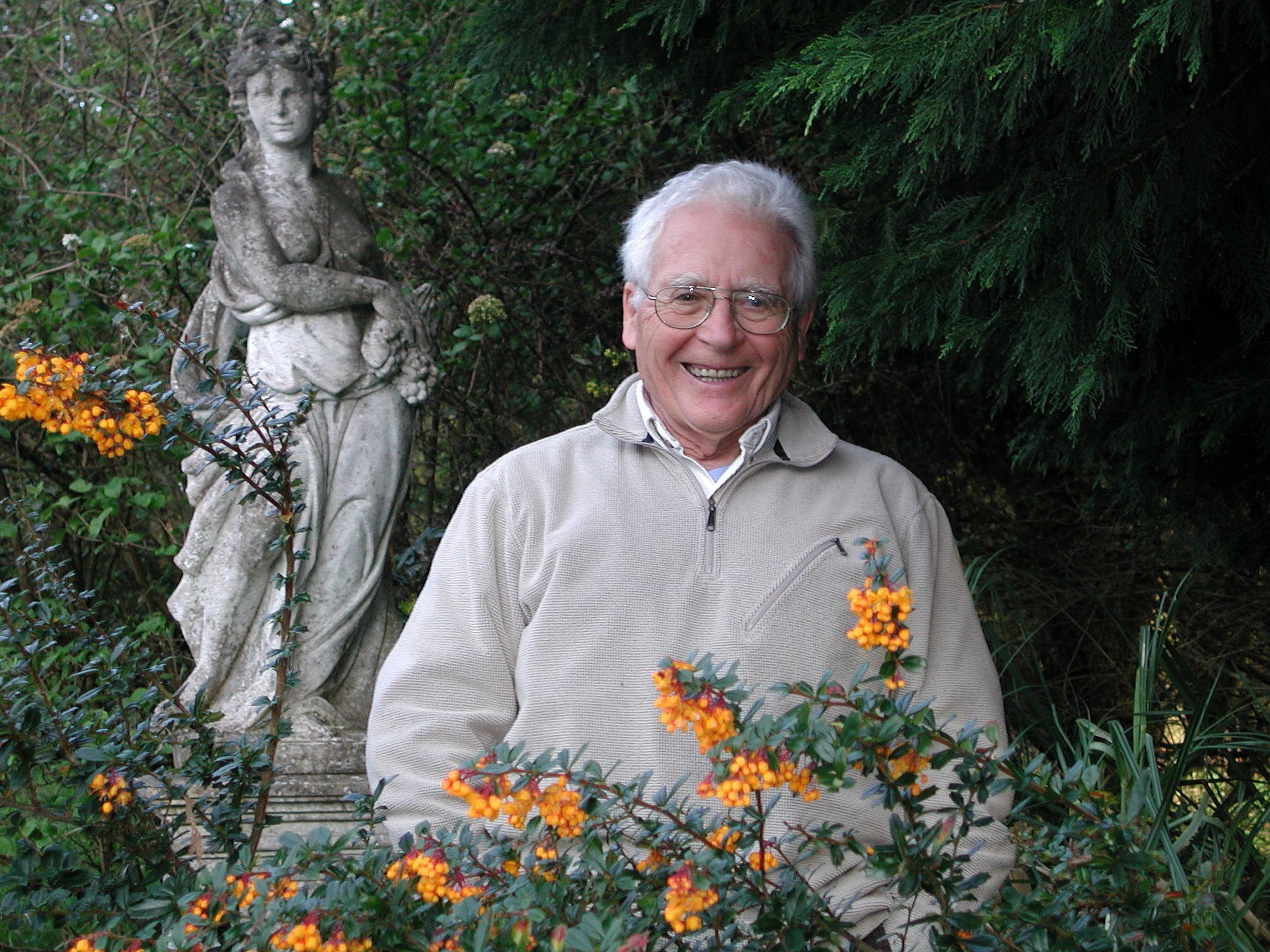
Lovelock in 2005

In Lovelock's 2006 book, The Revenge of Gaia, he argued that the lack of respect humans have had for Gaia, through the damage done to rainforests and the reduction in planetary biodiversity, is testing Gaia's capacity to minimise the effects of the addition of greenhouse gases to the atmosphere. This eliminates the planet's negative feedbacks and increases the likelihood of homeostatic positive feedback potential associated with runaway global warming. Similarly, the warming of the oceans is extending the oceanic thermocline layer of tropical oceans into the Arctic and Antarctic waters, preventing the rise of oceanic nutrients into the surface waters and eliminating the algal blooms of phytoplankton on which oceanic food chains depend. As phytoplankton and forests are the main ways in which Gaia draws down greenhouse gases, particularly carbon dioxide, taking it out of the atmosphere, the elimination of this environmental buffering will see, according to Lovelock, most of the Earth becoming uninhabitable for humans and other life-forms by the middle of this century, with a massive extension of tropical deserts. In 2012, Lovelock distanced himself from these conclusions, saying he had "gone too far" in describing the consequences of climate change over the next century in this book.

In his 2009 book, The Vanishing Face of Gaia, he rejected scientific models that disagree with the findings that sea levels are rising and Arctic ice is melting faster than the models predict. He suggested that we may already have passed the tipping point of terrestrial climate resilience into a permanently hot state. Given these conditions, Lovelock expected that human civilisation would be hard-pressed to survive. He expected the change to be similar to the Paleocene–Eocene Thermal Maximum when the temperature of the Arctic Ocean was 23 °C.

=== Nuclear power ===
Lovelock became concerned about the threat of global warming from the greenhouse effect. In 2004 he broke with many fellow environmentalists by stating that "only nuclear power can now halt global warming".

In his view, nuclear energy is the only realistic alternative to fossil fuels that can both fulfil the large scale energy needs of humankind while also reducing greenhouse emissions. He was an open member of Environmentalists for Nuclear Energy (EFN).

In 2005, against the backdrop of renewed UK government interest in nuclear power, Lovelock again publicly announced his support for nuclear energy, stating, "I am a Green, and I entreat my friends in the movement to drop their wrongheaded objection to nuclear energy". Although those interventions in the public debate on nuclear power were in the 21st century, his views on it were longstanding. In his 1988 book The Ages of Gaia, he stated:

I have never regarded nuclear radiation or nuclear power as anything other than a normal and inevitable part of the environment. Our prokaryotic forebears evolved on a planet-sized lump of fallout from a star-sized nuclear explosion, a supernova that synthesised the elements that go to make our planet and ourselves.

In The Revenge of Gaia (2006), where he put forward the concept of sustainable retreat, Lovelock wrote:

A television interviewer once asked me, "But what about nuclear waste? Will it not poison the whole biosphere and persist for millions of years?" I knew this to be a nightmare fantasy wholly without substance in the real world ... One of the striking things about places heavily contaminated by radioactive nuclides is the richness of their wildlife. This is true of the land around Chernobyl, the bomb test sites of the Pacific, and areas near the United States' Savannah River nuclear weapons plant of the Second World War. Wild plants and animals do not perceive radiation as dangerous, and any slight reduction it may cause in their lifespans is far less a hazard than is the presence of people and their pets ... I find it sad, but all too human, that there are vast bureaucracies concerned about nuclear waste, huge organisations devoted to decommissioning power stations, but nothing comparable to deal with that truly malign waste, carbon dioxide.

In 2019 Lovelock said he thought difficulties in getting nuclear power going again were due to propaganda, that "the coal and oil business fight like mad to tell bad stories about nuclear", and that "the greens played along with it. There's bound to have been some corruption there – I'm sure that various green movements were paid some sums on the side to help with propaganda".

=== Climate ===
Writing in The Independent in 2006, Lovelock argued that, as a result of global warming, "billions of us will die and the few breeding pairs of people that survive will be in the Arctic where the climate remains tolerable" by the end of the 21st century. The same year he suggested that "we have to keep in mind the awesome pace of change and realise how little time is left to act, and then each community and nation must find the best use of the resources they have to sustain civilisation for as long as they can." He further predicted in 2007 that the temperature increase would leave much of the world's land uninhabitable and unsuitable for farming, with northerly migrations and new cities created in the Arctic; furthermore, he added that much of Europe will have turned to desert and Britain will have become Europe's "life-raft" due to its stable temperature caused by being surrounded by the ocean. He was quoted in The Guardian in 2008 that 80% of humans will perish by 2100, and this climate change will last 100,000 years.

In a 2010 interview with the Guardian newspaper, he said that democracy might have to be "put on hold" to prevent climate change. He argued that since war caused countries to halt the democratic process, climate change (which he likened in gravity to war) should as well. Statements from 2012 portrayed Lovelock as continuing his concern over global warming while at the same time criticising extremism and suggesting alternatives to oil, coal and the green solutions he did not support.

In a 2012 interview aired on MSNBC, Lovelock stated that he had been "alarmist", using the words "All right, I made a mistake," about the timing of climate change and noted the documentary An Inconvenient Truth and the book The Weather Makers as examples of the same kind of alarmism. Lovelock still believed the climate to be warming, although not at the rate of change he once thought; he admitted that he had been "extrapolating too far." He believed that climate change was still happening, but it would be felt further in the future. He denied claims that the "science was settled" regarding climate change and stated that it was impossible for any scientist, including himself, to know the truth with certainty. He criticised environmentalists for treating environmentalism like a religion, and stated that guilting people for contributing to global warming did nothing to encourage them to become environmentalists.

In a 2012 MSNBC article, Lovelock stated that climate alarmism in the 1990s had resulted from scientists' overconfidence, during that decade, that global warming would occur at a high rate and result in a "frying world"; between 2000 and 2012 global temperatures stayed mostly the same, though carbon dioxide levels increased. In a follow-up interview also in 2012, Lovelock stated his support for natural gas; he favoured fracking as a low-polluting alternative to coal. He opposed the concept of "sustainable development", where modern economies might be powered by wind turbines, calling it meaningless drivel. He kept a poster of a wind turbine to remind himself how much he detested them.

In Novacene (2019), Lovelock proposed that benevolent superintelligence may take over and save the ecosystem and stated that the machines would need to keep organic life around to keep the planet's temperature habitable for electronic life. On the other hand, if instead life becomes entirely electronic, "so be it: we played our part and newer, younger actors are already appearing on stage".

==== Ocean fertilisation ====
In 2007, Lovelock and Chris Rapley proposed the construction of ocean pumps to pump water up from below the thermocline to "fertilize algae in the surface waters and encourage them to bloom". The basic idea was to accelerate the transfer of carbon dioxide from the atmosphere to the ocean by increasing primary production and enhancing the export of organic carbon (as marine snow) to the deep ocean. A scheme similar to that proposed by Lovelock and Rapley was later developed independently by a commercial company.

The proposal attracted widespread media attention and criticism. Commenting on the proposal, Corinne Le Quéré, a University of East Anglia researcher, said "It doesn't make sense. There is absolutely no evidence that climate engineering options work or even go in the right direction. I'm astonished that they published this. Before any geoengineering is put to work a massive amount of research is needed – research which will take 20 to 30 years". Other researchers claimed that "this scheme would bring water with high natural pCO_{2} levels (associated with the nutrients) back to the surface, potentially causing exhalation of CO_{2}". Lovelock subsequently said that his proposal was intended to stimulate interest and that research would be the next step, and several research studies were published in the wake of the original proposal. However, these estimated that the scheme would require a huge number of pipes, and that the main effect of the pipes may be on the land rather than in the ocean.

==== Sustainable retreat ====
Sustainable retreat is a concept developed by Lovelock to define the necessary changes to human settlement and dwelling at the global scale to adapt to global warming and prevent its expected negative consequences on humans.

Lovelock thought that people needed to retreat because development was no longer sustainable. He argued that people should be transported to Europe from low-lying areas, which he predicted would fare poorly in the future. He stated that the main point of sustainable retreat was everyone "absolutely doing their utmost to sustain civilization".

The concept of sustainable retreat emphasises a pattern of resource use that aims to meet human needs with lower levels or less environmentally harmful types of resources.

== Awards and recognition ==
Lovelock was elected a Fellow of the Royal Society in 1974. His nomination reads:

Lovelock has made distinguished contributions to several diverse fields, including a study of the transmission of respiratory infection, and methods of air sterilisation; the role of Ca and other divalent ions in blood clotting; damage to various living cells by freezing, thawing and thermal shock and its prevention by the presence of neutral solutes; methods of freezing and thawing small live animals; methods for preparing sperm for artificial insemination, which have been of major economic importance.

He has invented a family of ionisation detectors for gas chromatography. His electron capture detectors are the most sensitive that have been made and are universally used on pollution problems for residual halogen compounds. He has many inventions, including a gas chromatograph, which will be used to investigate planetary atmospheres. His chromatographic work has led to investigation of blood lipids in various animals, including arteriosclerotic humans. He has made a study of detecting life on other planets by analysis of their atmosphere and extended this to world pollution problems.

His work generally shows remarkable originality, simplicity and ingenuity.

Lovelock was awarded a number of prestigious prizes, including the Tswett Medal for Chromatography (1975), the American Chemical Society Award in Chromatography (1980), the World Meteorological Organization Norbert Gerbier–MUMM Award (1988), the Dr A. H. Heineken Prize for Environmental Sciences (1990) and the Royal Geographical Society Discovery Lifetime award (2001). In 2006 he received the Wollaston Medal, the Geological Society of London's highest award, whose previous recipients include Charles Darwin. Lovelock was appointed a Commander of the Order of the British Empire (CBE) for services to the study of the Science and Atmosphere in the 1990 New Year Honours and a Member of the Order of the Companions of Honour (CH) for services to Global Environmental Science in the 2003 New Year Honours.

=== Portraits ===
In March 2012, the National Portrait Gallery unveiled a new portrait of Lovelock by British artist Michael Gaskell, which was completed in 2011. The collection also has two photographic portraits by Nick Sinclair (1993) and Paul Tozer (1994). The archive of the Royal Society of Arts has a 2009 image taken by Anne-Katrin Purkiss. Lovelock agreed to sit for sculptor Jon Edgar in Devon during 2007, as part of the Environment Triptych (2008) along with heads of Mary Midgley and Richard Mabey. A bronze head is in the collection of the sitter, and the terracotta is in the artist's archive.

== Honours ==
=== Commonwealth honours ===
Country	Date	Appointment	Post-nominal letters
United Kingdom	1990	Commander of the Order of the British Empire	CBE
United Kingdom	2003	Member of the Order of the Companions of Honour	CH

=== Scholastic ===
==== University degrees ====
Location	Date	School	Degree
England	1941	Victoria University of Manchester	Bachelor of Science (BSc) in Chemistry
England	1948	London School of Hygiene and Tropical Medicine	Doctor of Philosophy (PhD) in Medicine
England	1959	University of London	Doctor of Science (D.Sc.) in Biophysics

==== Chancellor, visitor, governor, rector and fellowships ====
Location	Date	School	Position
United States	1954	Harvard University Medical School	Rockefeller Travelling Fellowship in Medicine
United States	1958–1959	Yale School of Medicine	Visiting Scientist
England	1994	Green Templeton College, Oxford	Senior Visiting Research Fellow

==== Honorary degrees ====
Location	Date	School	Degree
England	1982	University of East Anglia	Doctor of Science (D.Sc.)
England	1988	Plymouth Polytechnic	Doctor of Science (D.Sc.)
England	1988	University of Exeter	Doctor of Science (D.Sc.)
Sweden	1991	Stockholm University	Doctor of Science (D.Sc.)
Scotland	1993	University of Edinburgh	Doctor of Science (D.Sc.)
England	1996	University of Kent	Doctor of Science (D.Sc.)
England	1996	University of East London	Doctor of Science (D.Sc.)
United States	1997	University of Colorado Boulder	Doctor of Humane Letters (DHL)

=== Memberships and fellowships ===
Location	Date	Organisation	Position
United Kingdom	1974	Royal Society	Fellow (FRS)
United Kingdom	1986–1990	Marine Biological Association of the United Kingdom	President
United Kingdom	2014	Marine Biological Association of the United Kingdom	Honorary Fellow (Hon FMBA)

== Personal life ==
Lovelock married Helen Hyslop in 1942. They had four children and remained married until her death in 1989 from multiple sclerosis. He first met his second wife, Sandy, at the age of 69. Lovelock stated of their relationship: "... you would find the life of me and my wife Sandy to be an unusually happy one in simple beautiful but unpretentious surroundings."

Lovelock turned 100 in 2019. He died at his home in Abbotsbury, Dorset, on his 103rd birthday in 2022, of complications related to a fall.

== Published works ==
- Lovelock J, Epton S (6 February 1975). "The Quest for Gaia". New Scientist. 65 (935): 304.
- Lovelock J (1979). Gaia: A New Look at Life on Earth. Oxford University Press. ISBN 978-0-19-217665-3.
- Lovelock JE, Allaby M (1983). The Great Extinction. Garden City, New York: Doubleday. ISBN 978-0-385-18011-5.
- Lovelock J, Allaby M (1984). The Greening of Mars. New York: Warner Books (published 1985). ISBN 978-0-446-32967-5.
- Lovelock J (1988). The Ages of Gaia: A Biography of Our Living Earth. New York: Norton. ISBN 978-0-393-02583-5.
- Lovelock JE (1991). Gaia: The Practical Science of Planetary Medicine. Oxford University Press (published 2000). ISBN 978-0-19-521674-5.
- Lovelock J, et al. (1991). Scientists on Gaia. Cambridge, Massachusetts: MIT Press. ISBN 978-0-262-19310-8.
- Lovelock J (2000). Homage to Gaia: The Life of an Independent Scientist (Autobiography). Oxford University Press. ISBN 978-0-19-286213-6.
- Lovelock J (2005). Gaia: Medicine for an Ailing Planet. London: Gaia Books. ISBN 1-85675-231-3.
- Lovelock J (2006). The Revenge of Gaia: Why the Earth Is Fighting Back – and How We Can Still Save Humanity. London: Allen Lane. ISBN 978-0-7139-9914-3.
- Lovelock J (2009). The Vanishing Face of Gaia: A Final Warning: Enjoy It While You Can. Allen Lane. ISBN 978-1-84614-185-0.
- Lovelock J (2014). A Rough Ride to the Future. Penguin UK. ISBN 978-0-241-96142-1.
- Lovelock J, et al. (2016). The Earth and I. Taschen. ISBN 978-3-8365-5111-3. Archived from the original on 3 February 2017.
- Lovelock J, Appleyard B (2019). Novacene: The Coming Age of Hyperintelligence. Penguin UK. ISBN 978-0-241-39937-8.
- Lovelock J, Obrist HU (2023). Ever Gaia. Isolarii. ISBN 979-8-9871231-0-2.

== See also ==
- Gaianism
