= Small science =

Science

Small science (in contrast to big science) is science performed in a smaller scale, such as by individuals, small teams or within community projects.

Bodies which fund research, such as the National Science Foundation, DARPA, and the EU with its Framework programs, have a tendency to fund larger-scale research projects. Reasons include the idea that ambitious research needs significant resources devoted for its execution and the reduction of administrative and overhead costs on the funding body side. However, small science which has data that is often local and is not easily shared is funded in many areas such as chemistry and biology by these funding bodies.

== Importance ==
Small Science helps define the goals and directions of large scale scientific projects. In turn, results of large scale projects are often best synthesized and interpreted by the long-term efforts of the Small Science community. In addition, because Small Science is typically done at universities, it provides students and young researchers with an integral involvement in defining and solving scientific problems. Hence, small science can be seen as an important factor for bringing together science and society.

According to the Chronicle of Higher Education, James M. Caruthers, a professor of chemical engineering at Purdue University, data from Big Science is highly organized on the front end where researchers define it before it even starts rolling off the machines, making it easier to handle, understand, and archive. Small Science is "horribly heterogeneous," and far more vast. In time, Small Science will generate two to three times more data than Big Science.

The American Geophysical Union stresses the importance of small science in a position statement.

== Examples of results with high impact ==
Many historical examples show that results of Small Science can have enormous impacts:

- Galois theory, one of the foundational theories of abstract algebra was developed by Évariste Galois within just weeks.
- Albert Einstein developed his theory of special relativity as a hobby while working full-time in a patent office.
- Robert Goddard invented the liquid propelled and multi stage rockets largely on his own. These breakthroughs lead to the German V2 and the Apollo Saturn V rockets.

== See also ==
- Citizen science
- Independent scientist
