= Private income =

Income of an individual

Private income is either:

- any type of income received by a private individual or household, often derived from occupational activities, or
- income of an individual that is not in the form of a salary, wage, or commission (e.g. income from investments or renting land or other property).

Many people with a private income of the second type are comfortably or well off and may not need a job for additional income. People in such a position can have other pursuits, e.g., as a philanthropist, or in the past as a gentleman scientist, artist, clergyman or writer. Today among America's 146,000 highest income households, those making more than $1.6 million per year, 31% of all income was derived from investments.

== See also ==
- Trust fund – Three-party fiduciary relationship
- Passive income – Income that requires little to no effort to earn and maintain
- Unearned income – Income gained through ownership of land and other monopoly
- Economic rent – Difference between marginal product and opportunity cost
