= CLAW hypothesis =

Hypothesised negative feedback loop linking marine biota and the climate

The CLAW hypothesis proposes a negative feedback loop that operates between ocean ecosystems and the Earth's climate. The hypothesis specifically proposes that particular phytoplankton that produce dimethyl sulfide are responsive to variations in climate forcing, and that these responses act to stabilise the temperature of the Earth's atmosphere. The CLAW hypothesis was originally proposed by Robert Jay Charlson, James Lovelock, Meinrat Andreae and Stephen G. Warren, and takes its acronym from the first letter of their surnames.

== CLAW hypothesis ==
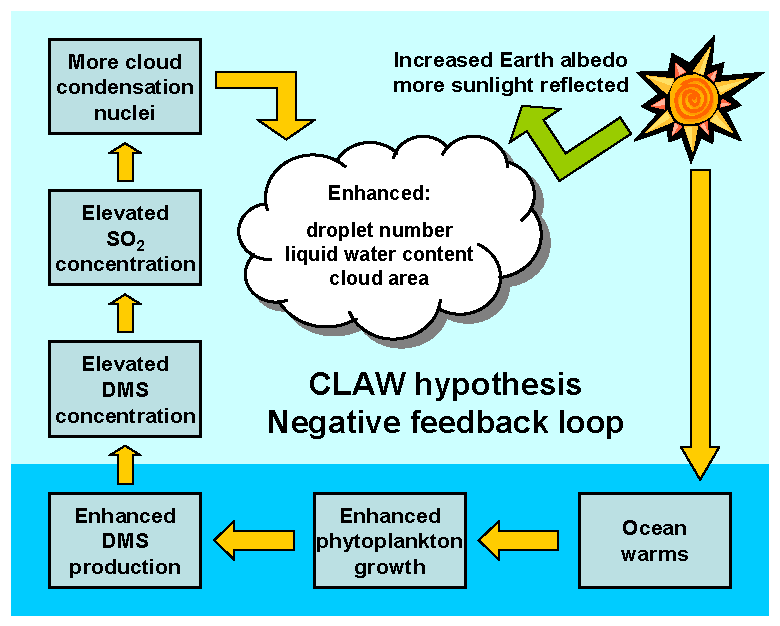
Schematic diagram of the CLAW hypothesis (Charlson et al., 1987)

The hypothesis describes a feedback loop that begins with an increase in the available energy from the sun acting to increase the growth rates of phytoplankton by either a physiological effect (due to elevated temperature) or enhanced photosynthesis (due to increased irradiance). Certain phytoplankton, such as coccolithophorids, synthesise dimethylsulfoniopropionate (DMSP), and their enhanced growth increases the production of this osmolyte. In turn, this leads to an increase in the concentration of its breakdown product, dimethyl sulfide (DMS), first in seawater, and then in the atmosphere. DMS is oxidised in the atmosphere to form sulfur dioxide, and this leads to the production of sulfate aerosols. These aerosols act as cloud condensation nuclei and increase cloud droplet number, which in turn elevate the liquid water content of clouds and cloud area. This acts to increase cloud albedo, leading to greater reflection of incident sunlight, and a decrease in the forcing that initiated this chain of events. The figure to the right shows a summarising schematic diagram. Note that the feedback loop can operate in the reverse direction, such that a decline in solar energy leads to reduced cloud cover and thus to an increase in the amount of solar energy reaching the Earth's surface.

A significant feature of the chain of interactions described above is that it creates a negative feedback loop, whereby a change to the climate system (increased/decreased solar input) is ultimately counteracted and damped by the loop. As such, the CLAW hypothesis posits an example of planetary-scale homeostasis or complex adaptive system, consistent with the Gaia hypothesis framed by one of the original authors of the CLAW hypothesis, James Lovelock.

Some subsequent studies of the CLAW hypothesis have uncovered evidence to support its mechanism, although this is not unequivocal. Other researchers have suggested that a CLAW-like mechanism may operate in the Earth's sulfur cycle without the requirement of an active biological component. A 2014 review article criticised the hypothesis for being an oversimplification and that the effect might be much weaker than proposed.

== Anti-CLAW hypothesis ==
In his 2006 book The Revenge of Gaia, Lovelock proposed that instead of providing negative feedback in the climate system, the components of the CLAW hypothesis may act to create a positive feedback loop.

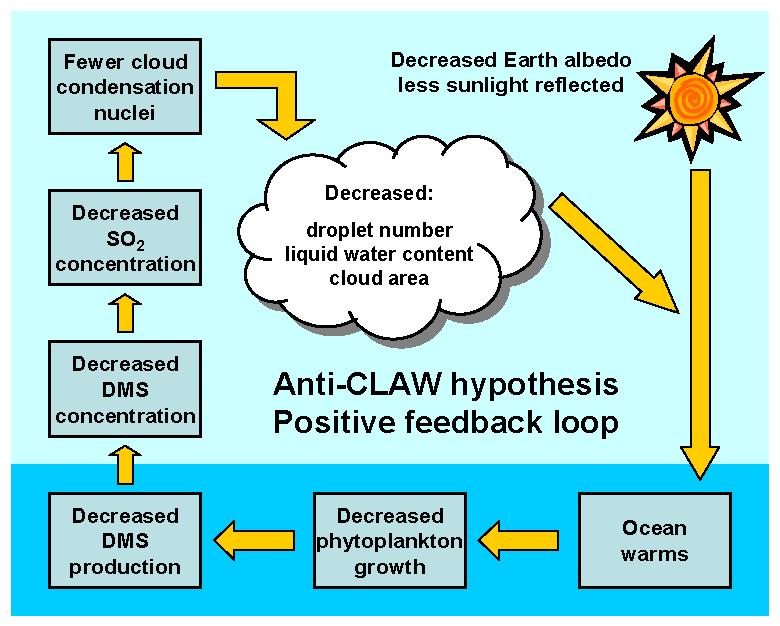
Schematic diagram of the anti-CLAW hypothesis (Lovelock, 2006)

Under future global warming, increasing temperature may stratify the world ocean, decreasing the supply of nutrients from the deep ocean to its productive euphotic zone. Consequently, phytoplankton activity will decline with a concomitant fall in the production of DMS. In a reverse of the CLAW hypothesis, this decline in DMS production will lead to a decrease in cloud condensation nuclei and a fall in cloud albedo. The consequence of this will be further climate warming which may lead to even less DMS production (and further climate warming). The figure to the right shows a summarising schematic diagram.

Evidence for the anti-CLAW hypothesis is constrained by similar uncertainties as those of the sulfur cycle feedback loop of the CLAW hypothesis. However, researchers simulating future oceanic primary production have found evidence of declining production with increasing ocean stratification, leaving open the possibility that such a mechanism may exist.

== See also ==
- Earth science
- Geophysiology
- Iron fertilization
