= Environmentalists for Nuclear =

Environmental non-profit organization

Environmentalists for Nuclear Energy (EFN) (French: Association des Écologistes Pour le Nucléaire, AEPN) is a pro-nuclear power non-profit organization that aims to provide information to the public on energy and the environment. It also promotes the benefits of nuclear energy for a cleaner world, and aims at uniting people in favor of clean nuclear energy. EFN is funded by the memberships and donations of its members.

The website of the organization states that environmental opposition to nuclear energy is the "greatest misunderstanding and mistake of the century".

== History ==
EFN was started by Bruno Comby in 1996 after the publication of his book Environmentalists For Nuclear Energy.

EFN had over 10,000 members and supporters in 2013, with local correspondents and a network of affiliated organizations and in more than 60 countries, to inform the public on energy and the environment.

Patrick Albert Moore and James Lovelock are supporters of the group.

The annual assembly of EFN is held at its headquarters in Houilles, a suburb of Paris, France.

The headquarters are in a positive energy ecohouse, powered with solar energy (thermal and photovoltaics), wind energy, geothermal air-conditioning, a high efficiency heat pump, double-flux ventilation, and just a small amount of low-carbon-emitting French nuclear energy. Conceptually designed by members of the organization, this house has an almost-nil carbon footprint (500 times less than a standard gas-heated construction of the same size).

== See also ==
- Environmental impact of nuclear power
