= Meinrat Andreae =

German biogeochemist (born 1949)

Meinrat O. Andreae, born in 1949 in Augsburg, is a German biogeochemist. Since 1987, he has worked as Director and Scientific Member at the Max Planck Institute for Chemistry (MPIC) in Mainz.

== Biography ==
Meinrat O. Andreae studied chemistry, mineralogy, and geochemistry at the Universities of Karlsruhe and Göttingen. In his diploma thesis, he studied the chemical composition and isotope geochemistry of highly metamorphic rocks of southern Norway. In 1977, he completed his PhD in oceanography from the Scripps Institution of Oceanography at the University of California at San Diego. In his doctoral thesis, he examined the chemical speciation of arsenic in the ocean. He discovered that planktonic algae regulate the oxidation state of arsenic in seawater and synthesize a variety of organoarsenic compounds. A secondary discovery of his work was that marine phytoplankton also manufactures the raw materials for the volatile sulfur compound dimethyl sulfide.

Andreae taught oceanography in the Department of Oceanography at Florida State University in Tallahassee, from 1978 until 1982 as an assistant professor, then from 1982 to 1986 as associate professor, and from 1986 to 1987 as full professor. During this time he researched the biogeochemical cycle of sulfur in the ocean and in the atmosphere. Along with Robert Jay Charlson, James Lovelock, and Stephen G. Warren, he developed the CLAW hypothesis, named after the initials of the authors. This hypothesis states that dimethyl sulfide from the ocean is converted in the atmosphere to sulfate particles, which then influence the formation of clouds and therefore the climate. Other works from this period were concerned with biogeochemical transformations of compounds of arsenic, antimony, selenium, tellurium and tin in the marine and terrestrial ecosystems. In the 1980s, he was together with Paul Crutzen one of the first scientists to discover the worldwide importance of biomass burning.

In 1987 he was appointed member of the Max Planck Institute for Chemistry (MPIC) in Mainz as director and scientific member. He initiated the Biogeochemistry Department at the MPIC and designed a broad research agenda on the chemical aspects of Earth System Science. There, he continued his work on biogeochemical cycles of trace metals, and extended his studies to the formation of aerosols from marine sulfur emissions. Campaigns in the Amazon forest then led to a new focus, the biogeochemical processes of exchange between tropical forests and the atmosphere. On expeditions in the Congo, the Amazon, and Southern Africa he studied the emissions from vegetation fires, the exchange of trace gases, and the production of biogenic aerosol particles. Since 2000, research into the role of atmospheric aerosols in the climate system has been at the center of Andreae's research. In 2009, he set up a new working group, applying methods of isotope geochemistry and mass spectrometry to problems of paleoclimatology and marine biogeochemistry.

As a visiting professor, Andreae taught at the University of Antwerp, the National Center for Atmospheric Research in Boulder, the University of California, Irvine and the California Institute of Technology in Pasadena. He is a member of the scientific steering committee of the Large Scale Biosphere Atmosphere Experiment in Amazonia (LBA) and was chairman of the IGBP's Integrated land Ecosystem Atmospheric Processes Study (ILEAPS). In addition, Andreae is a reviewing editor of the journal Science. In 2009 he became a fellow of the American Association for the Advancement of Science, in 2012 he became a Foreign Member of the Brazilian Academy of Arts and Sciences, in 2013 he was elected as a Foreign Honorary Member of the American Academy of Arts and Sciences, and in 2014 he was awarded the Waldo E. Smith Medal and became a fellow of the American Geophysical Union. In 2010, Andreae was awarded the degree of Doctor honoris causa by the Ghent University in Belgium.

Meinrat O. Andreae and his coworkers have published nearly 500 articles in scientific journals and books.

== Research ==
The scientists of the MPIC Department of Biogeochemistry, in close cooperation with the Departments of Atmospheric Chemistry and Multiphase Chemistry, study interactions between the atmosphere and biosphere of our planet. The results of these studies contribute to the understanding of global biogeochemical cycles, global climate processes, and the impact of mankind on these processes.

== Video ==
- Video abstract of Andreae's research on cloud formation
