= Novel food =

Food that does not have a significant history of consumption

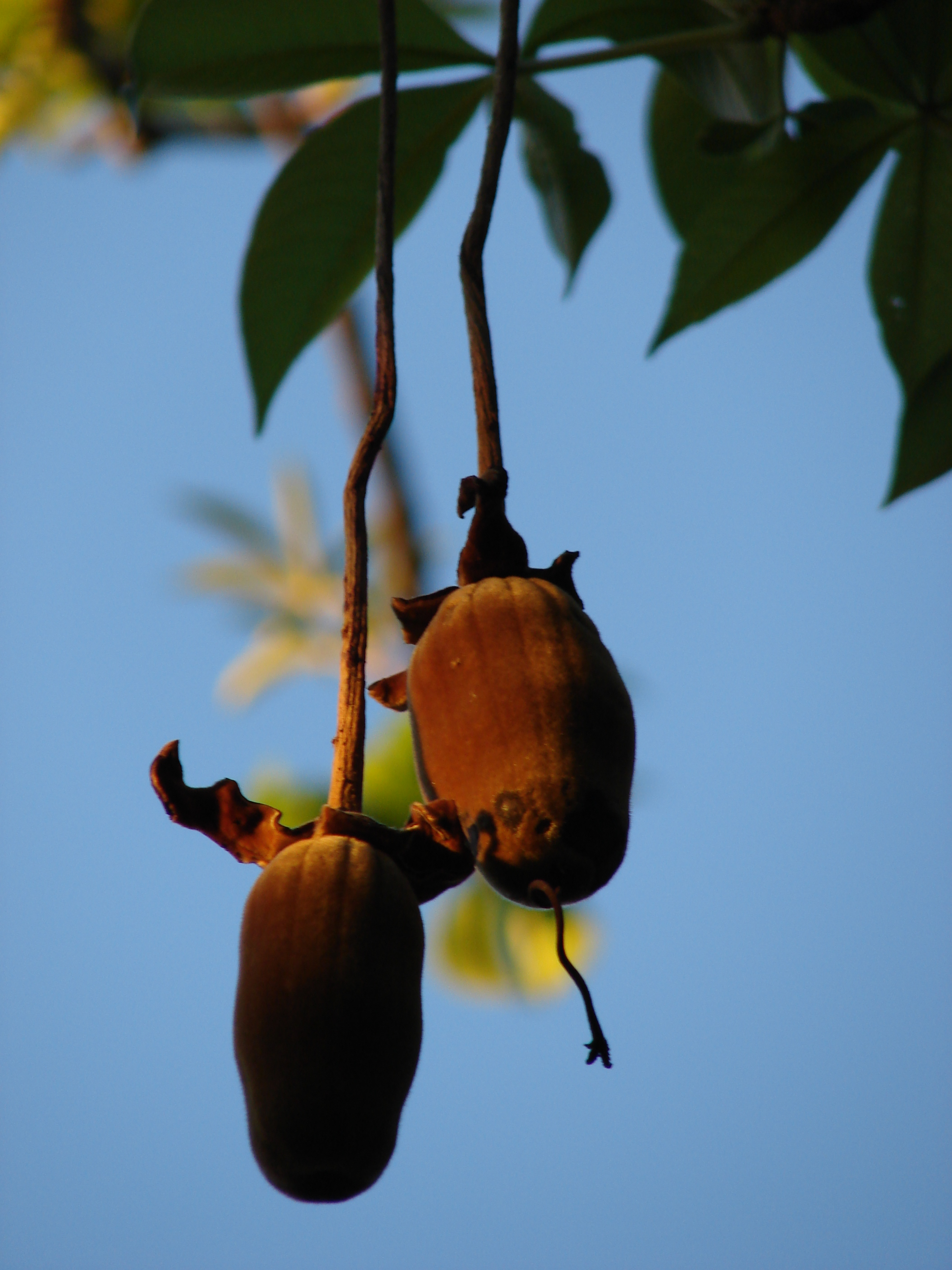
Adansonia digitata fruit pulp is considered novel food in the EU

A novel food is a type of food that does not have a significant history of consumption or is produced by a method that has not previously been used for food.

== Designer food ==
Designer food is a type of novel food that has not existed on any regional or global consumer market before. Instead it has been "designed" using biotechnological / bioengineering methods (e.g. genetically modified food) or "enhanced" using engineered additives. Examples like designer egg, designer milk, designer grains, probiotics, and enrichment with micro- and macronutrients and designer proteins have been cited. The enhancement process is called food fortification or nutrification (for making more nutritious crop varieties, there is a specific term called biofortification). Designer novel food often comes with sometimes unproven health claims ("superfoods").

Designer food is distinguished from food design, the aesthetic arrangement of food items for marketing purposes.

== European Union ==
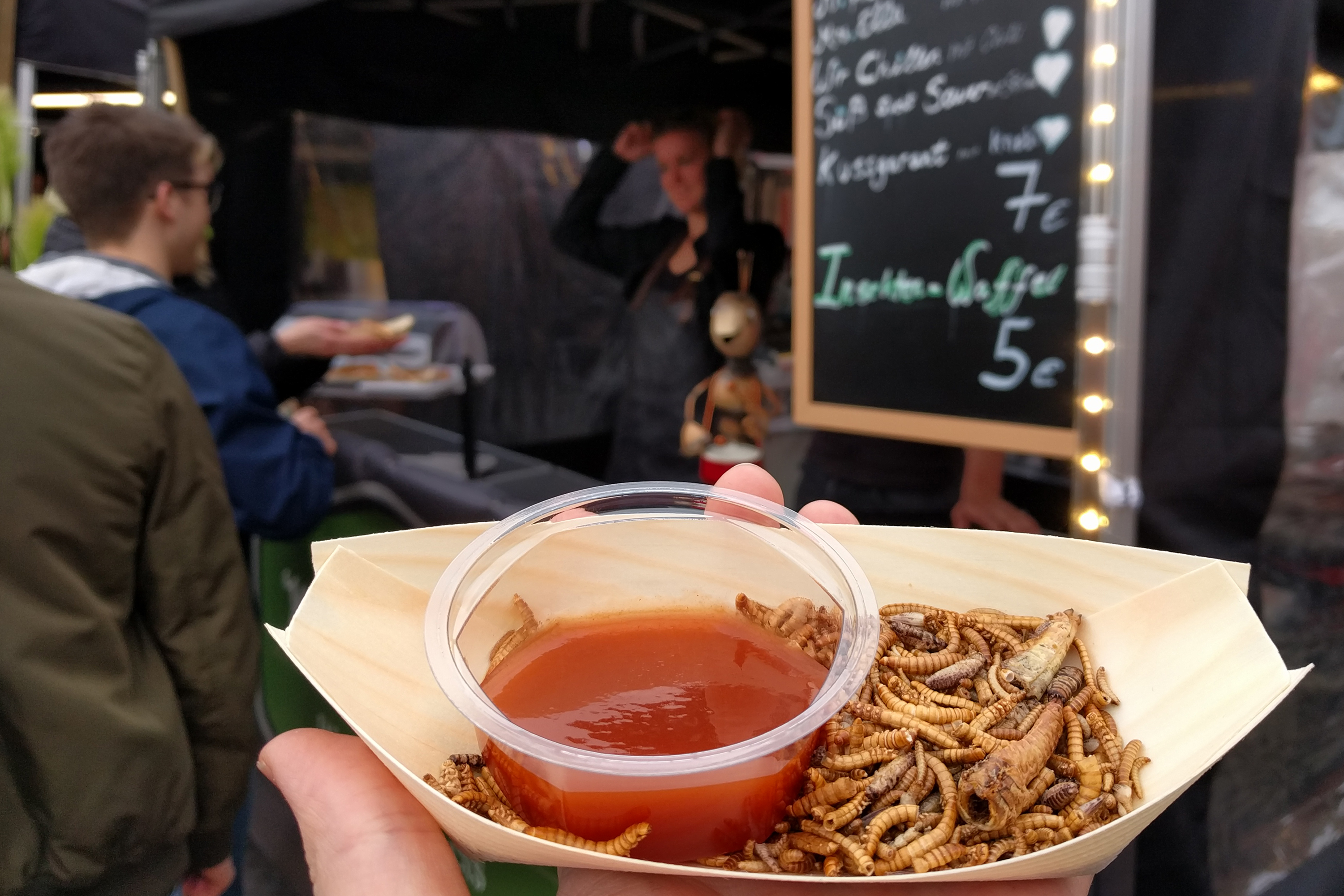
Whole, fried edible insects as street food in Germany - insect as food is considered novel food in the EU.

Novel foods or novel food ingredients have no history of "significant" consumption in the European Union prior to 15 May 1997. Any food or food ingredient that falls within this definition must be authorised according to the Novel Food legislation, Regulation (EC) No 258/97 of the European Parliament and of the Council.

Applicants can consult the guidance document compiled by the European Commission, which highlights the scientific information and the safety assessment report required in each case.

The Novel Food regulation stipulates that foods and food ingredients falling within the scope of this regulation must not:

- present a danger for the consumer;
- mislead the consumer; or
- differ from foods or food ingredients which they are intended to replace to such an extent that their normal consumption would be nutritionally disadvantageous for the consumer.

There are two possible routes for authorization under the Novel Food legislation: a full application and a simplified application. The simplified application route is only applicable where the EU member national competent authority, e.g., the National Agency for Food, Environmental, and Occupational Health & Safety (ANSES) in France, believes that the novel food in question is substantially equivalent to an existing food or food ingredient.

There have been a number of products launched as a result of food or food ingredients authorised under the Novel Food legislation. Benecol, containing phytostanols and Flora ProActiv, containing phytosterols are commercially successful products that help to reduce cholesterol levels.

Originally, the Novel Food legislation was conceived by the European Commission in response to the arrival of food products derived from GM crops. These types of GM derived food are now regulated by separate legislation, Regulation (EC) No 1829/2003 of the European Parliament and of the council.

In its current format, exotic fruit and vegetables, which have a long history of safe use outside of the European Union, fall within the definition of a novel food. As a consequence, each of these food products must undergo a safety assessment prior to being marketed. This has long been an issue of contention for food manufacturers and producers outside the EU who view this as an economic trade barrier. A good example of this situation can be illustrated with baobab (Adansonia digitata). This fruit is wild-harvested across Southern Africa and has a long history of use as a food amongst the indigenous tribes in this continent. Nonetheless, Baobab Dried Fruit Pulp required authorisation under the Novel Food legislation before any food products containing this ingredient could be marketed in the EU.

The Baobab Dried Fruit Pulp novel food application, pioneered by John Wilkinson, a botanical regulatory consultant (together with his client Phytotrade Africa) was also the first successful submission to demonstrate safety without the need for animal testing. Instead, this application used the history of use alongside detailed analyses of the nutritional and phytochemical components in Baobab to demonstrate safety. This has lowered the costs for approval from an average of €10 million to less than €100,000 and thus opened the EU to access non-Western fruits, vegetables and nutraceuticals while at the same time saving unnecessary animal testing.

=== Revision of the EU novel food regulation ===
In 2008, the European Parliament, European Commission, and Council of the European Union began talks to revise the regulation because it was accepted that essential elements needed to be discussed and resolved.

However, the revision came to a standstill on 28 March 2011 when the three Institutions failed to reach agreement at a final conciliation meeting on the issue of cloning. Disagreement centred on the European Parliament being in favour of a total EU market ban on foods from clones and their offspring/descendants, while some members of the Council of the European Union were not in favour as they considered offspring to be bred using normal (or traditional) methods, therefore not falling under the definition of a novel food.

According to the European Parliament, it had tried to compromise, backing down on demands for a full ban on food from cloned animals and their descendants, to mandatory labelling of all food products from clones and their offspring as a bare minimum. The Council of the European Union decided that the solution presented by the European Parliament could not be implemented in practice because it would not be in compliance with the international trade rules that the European Union has signed. Unable to move things forward, the Commission gave up the revision process for the time being.

Following the 2011 standstill, the Commission decided to table a new proposal in December 2013, limiting its scope to the safety of novel foods, where a general agreement had already been reached in the previous dealing, while deferring the cloning issue to separate legislation. This time, negotiations eventually proved successful, and the Novel Food Regulation (EC) No. 2015/2283 was finally approved in November 2015, and entered into force on 1 January 2018, following the adoption by the Commission of required implementation acts.

== Canada ==
In Canada, novel foods are regulated under the Novel Foods Regulations. The regulations define novel food as:

- Products that have never been used as food;
- Foods that result from a process that has not been previously used for food; or
- Foods that have undergone genetic modification and have new traits.

The Novel Foods Regulation requires that a company wanting to sell a novel food notify Health Canada prior to marketing or advertising the product. Pre-market notification permits Health Canada to conduct a thorough safety assessment of all biotechnology-derived foods to demonstrate that a novel food is safe and nutritious before it is allowed in the Canadian marketplace.

To date, more than 90 novel foods have been approved for sale in Canada including a number of canola, corn, cottonseed and flax crop lines. Some of the novel traits include herbicide tolerance and pest and disease resistance. In spite of the benefits brought about by the development of novel foods, there are also a number of concerns that have been raised concerning their potential impact on the environment and on human health and safety.

== China ==
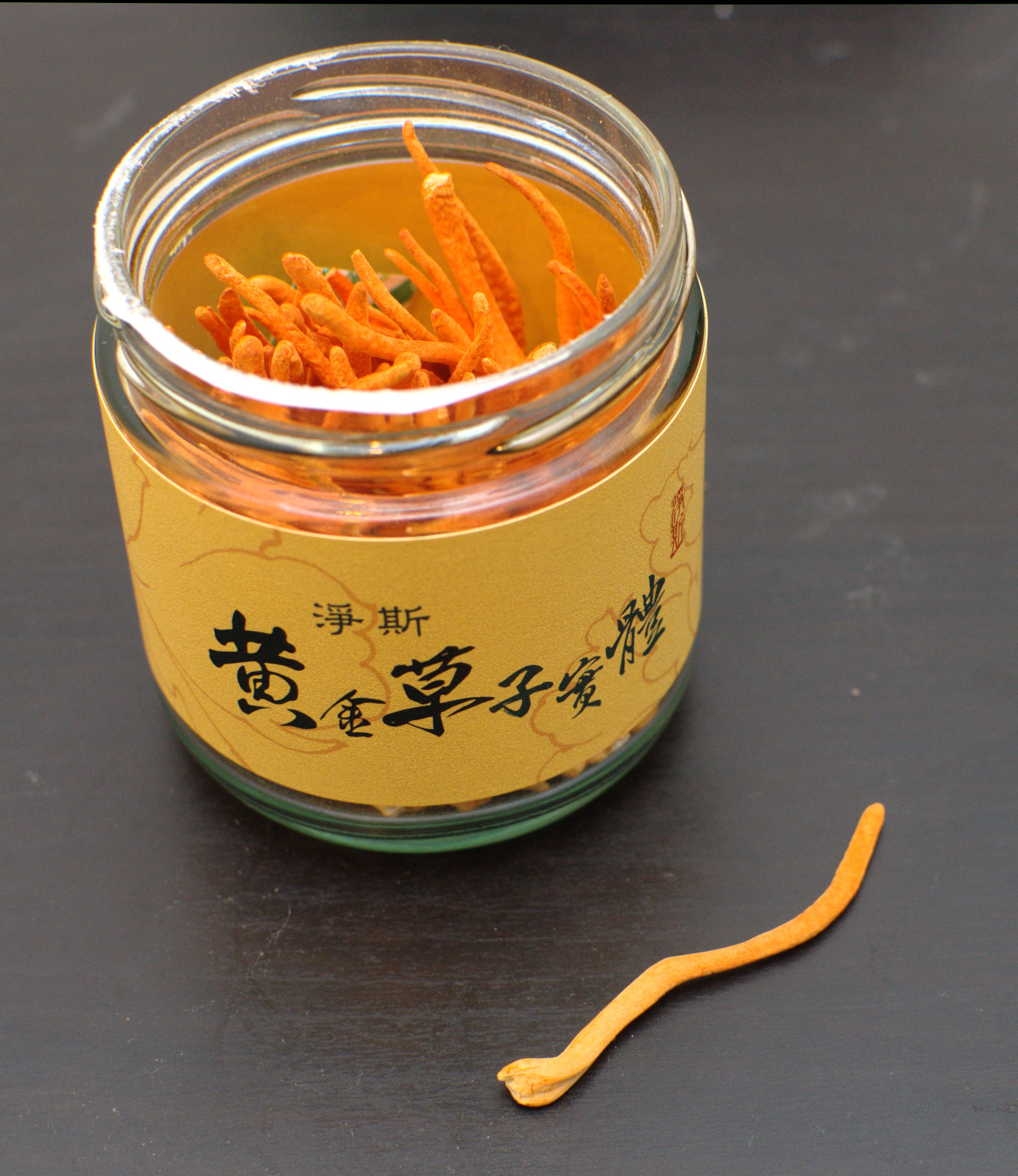
Jar of dry Cordyceps militaris fruiting body.

China maintains a list of novel foods including ginseng root (only those cultivated for under 5 years), Cordyceps militaris fruiting body, Moringa oleifera leaf, inulin, and Lactiplantibacillus plantarum, totalling 149 items as of December 2023. Novel foods are subject to special labeling such as daily consumption limits.

Some food formerly considered novel have been re-approved as regular ingredients. These include:

- A handful of traditional Chinese medicine substances traditionally used in Chinese food therapy in the "both food and Chinese medicine according to tradition" (按照传统既是食物又是中药材) lists, commonly known as the "medicine and food, same origin" (药食同源) lists. Examples include Angelica sinensis, Cistanche deserticola, and Dendrobium officinale root.
- Novel foods that have later been presented with proof of prior use, making them no longer novel. Examples include many regional specialties such as notoginseng flower and leaf-stem, Dendrobium officinale flower and leaves, Lycium ruthenicum fruit, and latex tree seed oil.
- Novel foods (and petitions) that received new regulation that specify a standard for them as a regular ingredient such as farmed fugu, tissue-cultivated ginseng, and adventitious roots of ginseng.
- Novel foods (and petitions) that were found to have substantial equivalence with a previously standardized ingredient. Examples include ingredients made from new production processes such as fish oil, GABA, soy oligosaccharide, chitosan, and MCT oil as well as extracts such as mulberry tree leaf extract (considered substantially equivalent to the leaf itself).

== See also ==
- Cellular agriculture
- Cultured meat
- Generally recognized as safe
- Substantial equivalence
