= John Wilkinson (chemist) =

English chemist (born 1961)

John Wilkinson (born 1961) is an English independent scientist specialising primarily in organic chemistry, phytochemistry, pharmacognosy, and synergism in botanical medicines, botanical foods and ecological biochemistry, and who led the first European degree course (Bachelor of Science with Honours) for herbal medicine, at Middlesex University in the United Kingdom in 1994.

== Biography ==
=== Early life ===
Wilkinson was born in Croydon, Surrey, UK, in 1961, from a working-class background. By the time he was 12 years old he had his own private laboratory and still does to this day. He was inspired and encouraged by Dr Phillips, a gifted science teacher at Stanley Technical High School, to pursue his dream of becoming a chemist when he demonstrated that he knew the answers to "A level" chemistry exams and above despite being only 14 years of age. He was also inspired by a chemistry teacher, Mr Neil Miller at Croydon College, and then went on to study Chemistry – by – thesis at Sussex University where he undertook a three-year research programme, remarkably as an undergraduate, on the chemistry of bioluminescence under the supervision of Professor Frank McCapra.

From 1985 to 1987, Wilkinson worked for Wellcome Research Laboratories and Beecham in the area of drug discovery. He was one of the first graduate scientists to be given 20% of his work time to develop his own research ideas.

Wilkinson was awarded a Science and Engineering Research Council (SERC) Instant award which was then later funded by ICI and obtained his PhD from Imperial College London (1987–1990) working with Professor William Motherwell.

Wilkinson was then awarded the prestigious SERC-NATO post-doctoral fellowship to work with the Nobel Prize–winning Professor George Olah in Los Angeles, California, (1991–1992), where he worked on, among other things, natural products chemistry, organic chemistry and Buckminsterfullerenes.

Following his post-doctoral work in the United States, Wilkinson returned to the UK and became a visiting research fellow in Phytochemistry at the University of Exeter in 1993, with Professor Stan Roberts, and was also a visiting lecturer at The School of Phytotherapy in East Sussex with the eminent medical herbalist and scientist, Hein Zeylstra (1928–2001). He was also an academic as senior lecturer in phytochemistry and pharmacognosy from 1994 to 2004 developing a new academic discipline and evolving over that time to become an independent scientist. He continues to do research, teaching and act as an adviser on an international basis to universities and companies around the World.

=== Herbal medicine and Middlesex University ===
In 1994, Wilkinson programme led the first herbal medicine degree course in Europe, from its beginnings in 1994 at Middlesex University. He was also appointed as a senior lecturer in phytochemistry and pharmacognosy, where he remained until 2004.

During his tenure at Middlesex University, Wilkinson founded the Herbal Research Laboratories in 1996. He became head of the Phytochemistry Discovery Group and led a team of 10 post-doctoral scientists, research assistants and other staff members. He was also a guest lecturer at Oxford University Medical School where he taught medical undergraduates the scientific aspects of herbal medicines.

He began a natural product research and regulatory consultancy company in 2001. Despite leaving Middlesex University in 2004, he ran the company until 2012, while undertaking research as an independent scientist. He then established "Dr John Wilkinson Consultancy" as a business and also a vehicle for conducting and funding research as an independent scientist. His research funded by individuals, companies and through "crowd funding" focuses on several areas:

- Research on molecular synergy effects in botanical extracts, herbal medicines and essential oils (the latter with reference to their use in improvements and maintenance of memory functioning)
- Biochemical ecology – synergism in nature
- New exotic fruits and their unique nutritional properties

Dr Wilkinson obtained the first novel food approval in the European Union for a nutraceutical based on a safe history of use rather than conventional toxicological studies. This approval effectively broke the trade barriers and opened the European Union to new fruits, vegetables and nutraceuticals from developing countries.

Dr Wilkinson continues to work in the area of regulatory approval for health claims on food labels, novel foods, herbal medicines and food supplements in the EU, the US and elsewhere.

=== Other achievements ===
Wilkinson has been approached by TV, radio and newspapers for interviews and opinions concerning these types of food and medicinal based products. Wilkinson has published a number of articles during his academic career presented at conferences and trade shows related to natural products. He has also published material for inclusion in a number of books.
