= Marcia Baker =

Atmospheric scientist

Marcia Bourgin Baker
- Born: Marcia Bourgin; 1938 (age 87–88)
- Education: University of Washington
- Children: David Baker, Karen Baker, Linda Baker
- Scientific career
- Thesis: Ion transport through nerve membranes (1971)

Marcia Baker is a retired professor known for her research on cloud physics which informs global climate models and defines the processes leading to the formation of lightning from clouds. She is the mother of Nobel laureate David Baker.

== Education and career ==
Baker graduated in 1955 from Urbana High School in Illinois. She earned a scholarship on the basis of "scholastic achievement and promise of effective participation and leadership" to attend Cornell University from which she earned a B.S. in 1959. She earned an M.S. from Stanford University in 1960 and a Ph.D. in physics in 1971 from the University of Washington. She remained at the University of Washington following her Ph.D., initially as a research associate. She was promoted to professor of geophysics and atmospheric sciences in 1988. She retired in 2004

== Research ==
Baker's research on cloud physics informs climate change models. Her early research examined how atmospheric particles absorb energy and the formation of droplets within cumulus clouds. Her modeling of turbulent mixing within clouds and the connections between cloud thickness and precipitation play a role in modeling of global climate. She has also used a combination of modeling and satellite observations to establish the processes that lead to the formation of lightning.

=== Selected publications ===
- Baker, Marcia B.; Charlson, Robert J. (1990). "Bistability of CCN concentrations and thermodynamics in the cloud-topped boundary layer". Nature. 345 (6271): 142–145. Bibcode:1990Natur.345..142B. doi:10.1038/345142a0. ISSN 0028-0836. S2CID 34623897.
- Pincus, Robert; Baker, Marcia B. (1994). "Effect of precipitation on the albedo susceptibility of clouds in the marine boundary layer". Nature. 372 (6503): 250–252. Bibcode:1994Natur.372..250P. doi:10.1038/372250a0. ISSN 0028-0836. S2CID 4356466.
- Baker, M. B. (16 May 1997). "Cloud Microphysics and Climate". Science. 276 (5315): 1072–1078. doi:10.1126/science.276.5315.1072.
- Roe, Gerard H.; Baker, Marcia B. (2007-10-26). "Why Is Climate Sensitivity So Unpredictable?". Science. 318 (5850): 629–632. Bibcode:2007Sci...318..629R. doi:10.1126/science.1144735. ISSN 0036-8075. PMID 17962560. S2CID 7325301.
- Baker, Marcia B.; Peter, Thomas (2008). "Small-scale cloud processes and climate". Nature. 451 (7176): 299–300. Bibcode:2008Natur.451..299B. doi:10.1038/nature06594. ISSN 0028-0836. PMID 18202649.

== Awards and honors ==
- Fellow, American Geophysical Union
- Fellow, American Meteorological Society
- Fellow, Royal Meteorological Society
