= Paul Forman =

Paul Forman may refer to:

- Paul Forman (actor), English actor and model
- Paul Forman (historian) (born 1937), American historian of the history of physics
