= History of weapons =

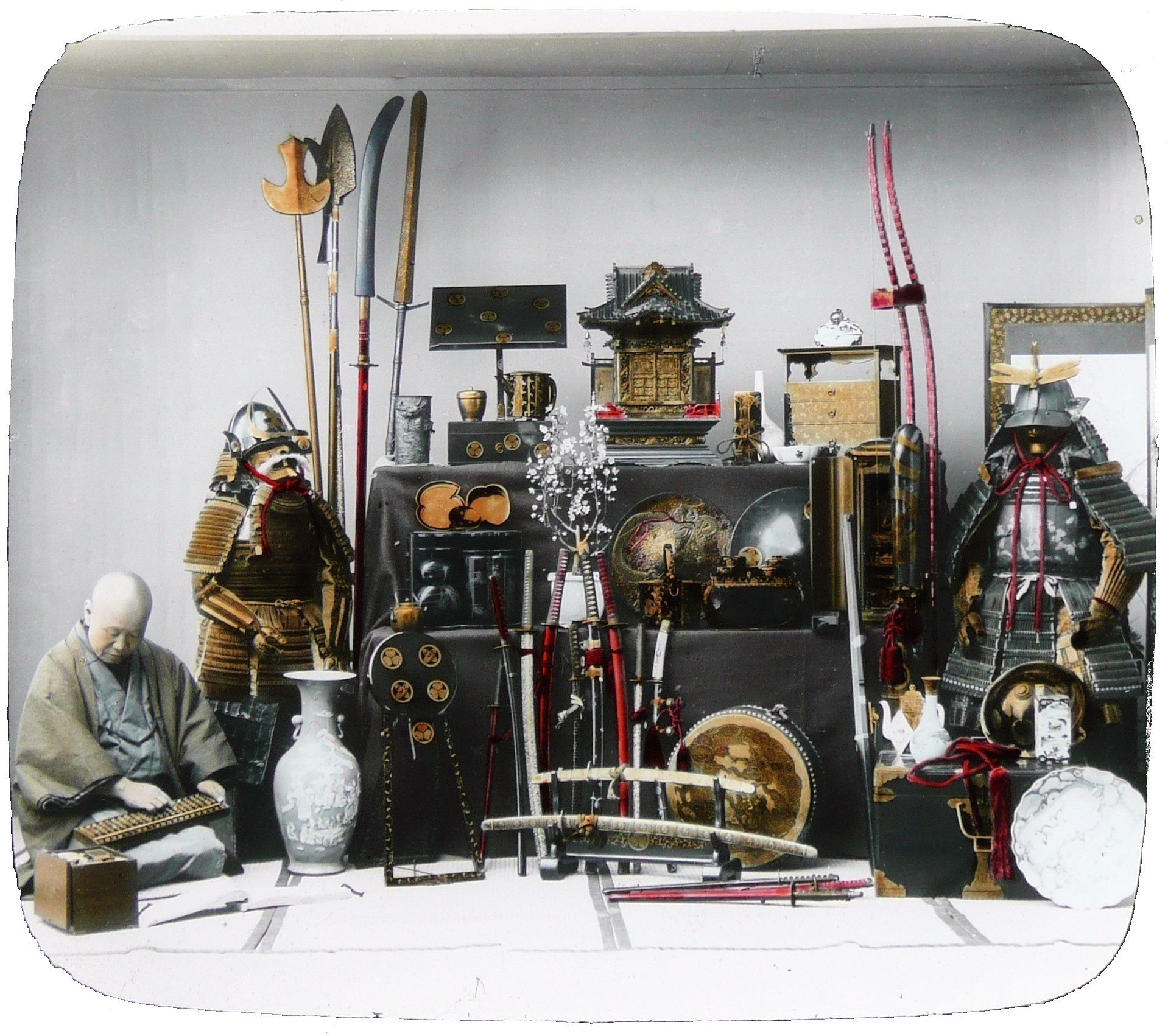
Old Japanese weapons and other military paraphernalia, c. 1892–95

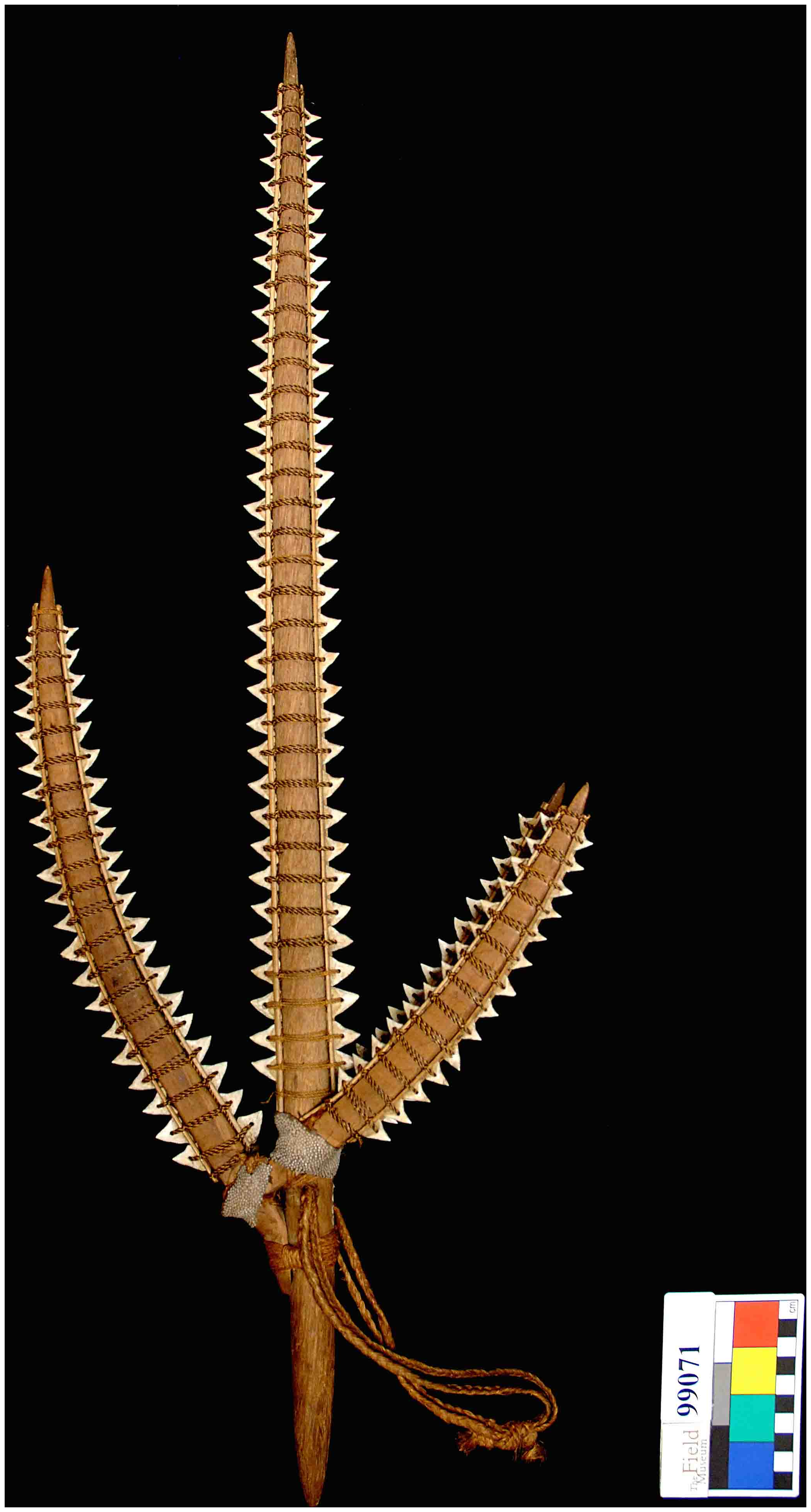
A Gilbertese shark-toothed weapon (late 19th century)

Major innovations in the history of weapons have included the adoption of different materials – from stone and wood to different metals, and modern synthetic materials such as plastics – and the developments of different weapon styles either to fit the terrain or to support or counteract different battlefield tactics and defensive equipment.

People have used weapons in warfare, hunting, self-defense, law enforcement, and criminal activity. Weapons also serve many other purposes in society including use in sports, collections for display, and historical displays and demonstrations. As technology has developed throughout history, weapons have changed with it.

The use of weapons is a major driver of cultural evolution and human history up to today, since weapons are a type of tool which is used to dominate and subdue autonomous agents such as animals and by that allow for an expansion of the cultural niche, while simultaneously other weapon users (i.e., agents such as humans, groups, cultures) are able to adapt to weapons of enemies by learning, triggering a continuous process of competitive technological, skill and cognitive improvement (arms race).

== Prehistory and the ancient world ==
=== Stone tips, arrows and bows ===
Stone tips are one of the earliest forms of weapons assumed by archaeologists, with the earliest surviving examples of stone tips with animal blood dating to around 64,000 years ago from the KwaZulu-Natal, in what is now South Africa. These early arrows were just a stone tip, which is advantageous over organic materials because it enables weapons to cut through tougher hides and create larger wounds, killing more easily.

The oldest known evidence of the bow and arrow comes from South African sites such as Sibudu Cave, where likely arrowheads have been found, dating from approximately 72,000–60,000 years ago.

The oldest extant bows, from the Holmegård region in Denmark, date to around 6,000 BCE. The bows were quite effective against the enemies that were far from the archer, and so archers were sought after in recruitment for armies. When people started horse riding at around c. 2000 BCE., composite bows were created. In 1200 BCE, the Hittites, originating from Anatolia, shot arrows using their bows on light chariots. In 1000 BCE some of these horse-riding archers from Central Asia invented the recurve bow, which was in the shape of a "W" and had an improved elasticity.

People from the Nile used relatively long bows for better accuracy, they also used composite bows. Civilizations all over the world produced bows according to their respective vegetation. The Chinese made bows from bamboo sticks while others who did not have the right kind of wood needed for making bows, produced composite bows. According to Chinese beliefs and mythology, a story is narrated and written in old Chinese texts which says how bow and arrow were invented.

ONCE upon a time, Huangdi went out hunting armed with a stone knife. Suddenly, a tiger sprang out of the undergrowth, Huangdi shinned up a mulberry tree to escape. Being a patient creature, the tiger sat down at the bottom of the tree to see what would happen next. Huangdi saw that the mulberry wood was supple, so he cut off a branch with his stone knife to make a bow. Then he saw a vine growing on the tree, and he cut a length from it to make a string. Next he saw some bamboo nearby that was straight, so he cut a piece to make an arrow. With his bow and arrow, he shot the tiger in the eye. The tiger ran off and Huangdi made his escape.

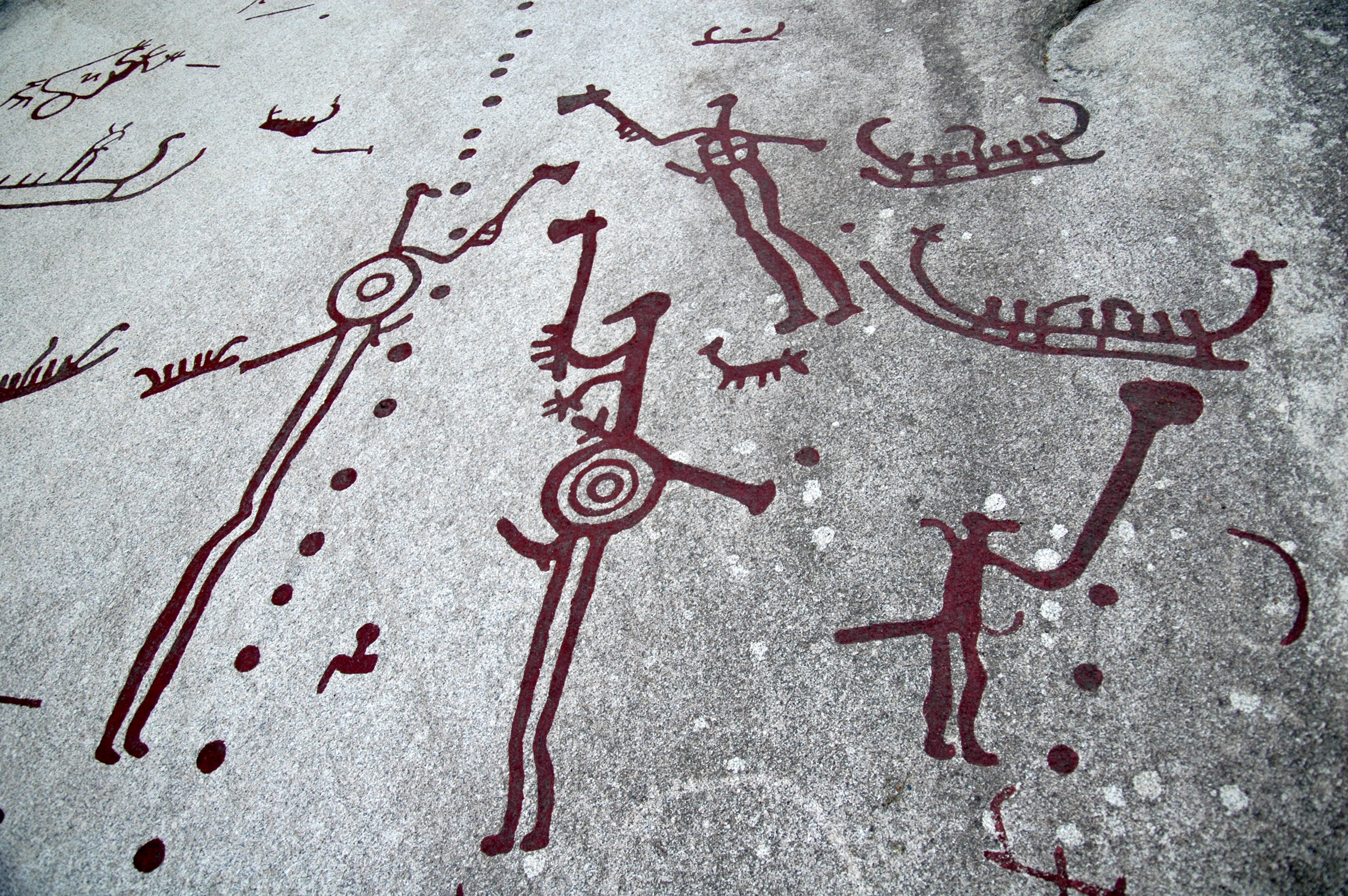
Men with weapons. Rock Carvings in Tanum, western Sweden

As humans discovered new natural resources beneath the Earth's surface, traditional weapons were replaced as methods for metal-working developed.

After the discovery of pure copper in Anatolia, around 6000 BCE, copper metallurgy spread in Egypt and Mesopotamia. Around 3500 BCE the art of metallurgy spread into India, China and Europe. Bronze, an alloy of copper and tin, had been used as far back as 4500 BCE, as it is much harder than pure copper. It was used extensively in Asia: the Indus Valley Civilization flourished as a result of improved metallurgy. Neolithic communities who lived primarily in the upper Yellow River in China also used bronze items extensively as a number of artifacts were recovered at the Majiayao site. Bronze was produced on a large scale in China for weapons, including spears, pole-axes, pole-based dagger-axes, composite bows, and bronze or leather helmets. From the excavations at Zhengzhou, it is evident that the Chinese during the Shang dynasty had well built walls, large buildings, bronze foundries, and bone and pottery workshops.

Bronze significantly contributed to the ancient world and helped cultures of Mesopotamia, Egypt, Greece, Rome, Indus and China flourish. Bronze replaced stone in weapons. During the Bronze Age maces were in high demand. The Sumerians were the first people on record to have used bronze weapons. Native Americans mostly used flint spears and knives but used bronze for ceremonies and intricate decorations. Ancient artisans soon discovered the drawbacks of bronze for producing armaments, as while weapons made of bronze could be sharpened easily, they were not able to hold their edge. Along with maces, bows and arrows and slings were used in wars. Bows and arrows were preferred over spears because they were easy to handle, provided greater mobility, were more accurate and did not require as much raw material. Bows and arrows were a boon for hunters as they could hunt more effectively with a bow and arrow than with a spear.

=== The Sumerians and Akkadians ===
The earliest civilizations in southern Mesopotamia, modern-day Iraq, were the Sumerians and Akkadians. The occupied land was open to enemy attacks from the many barbarian tribes. The Sumerian warrior was equipped with spears, maces, swords, clubs and slings. Sargon of Akkad (2333–2279 BCE) was a great military leader and used both infantry and chariots. The chariot troops used both spears and bows and arrows which proved to be effective.

For a long time the Egyptians' strategically advantageous locale allowed them to remain free from enemy attacks. Egypt was considered to be peaceful in the ancient world. They never considered training an army for the sake of invasion or defense of their own province. During the 15th Dynasty, a tribe known to be the Hyksos surprised the Egyptians when they marched into Egypt in the Second Intermediate Period with chariots. At this time, weapons superior to those possessed by the Egyptians were being developed further away in Asia. Tribes using these new and sophisticated weapons started to conquer new lands and at the same time exchange their knowledge of weapons with other civilizations. The Hyksos were among these invaders. Many historians believe that the Hyksos came from Mesopotamia, although the exact location is still a mystery. The invaders used composite bows as well as improved recurve bows and arrowheads. Unlike the Sumerians, they had horse-drawn chariots and not donkeys, and wore mailed shirts and metal helmets. They were also armed with superior daggers and swords.

Before the Hyksos invasion, the Egyptians did not have a cavalry because, it is believed, their small horses were not strong enough to support a rider. It was from the Hyksos charioteers that the use of horses in warfare was introduced to Egyptian culture. When the Egyptians came to power once again, after a civil war with the Hyksos rulers, they continued to use horse-drawn chariots in their armies.

=== Ancient naval weapons ===
Fish were a major source of food in the ancient world, and the Egyptians lived on whatever the river Nile had to offer to them. Papyrus boats are reported to have been first constructed in the predynastic period for the purpose of fishing. Most of the Egyptians used boats to transport warriors. In order to intercept a foreign boat, they used large stones, which they would hurl in the direction of enemy boats, by hand or using a catapult. The Egyptians traded with the Phoenicians around 2200 BCE. For safety of their boats they would fix a bow. The Egyptian New Kingdom re-organized the standing army and also focused on making new and improved boats. During this period, Egypt's navy was extensive, and bigger ships of seventy to eighty tons suited to long voyages became quite common. Many cargo ships were converted into battle ships. Seafaring was not safe, and in order to have smooth trading relations, they built a large fleet and took control of the sea. The temple of Medinet Habu has reliefs depicting the fleet of Ramses III fighting a naval battle against the Sea Peoples. The Phoenicians are said to have developed the first war galley armed with a battering ram for attacking other ships in the ancient world.

=== War chariots ===
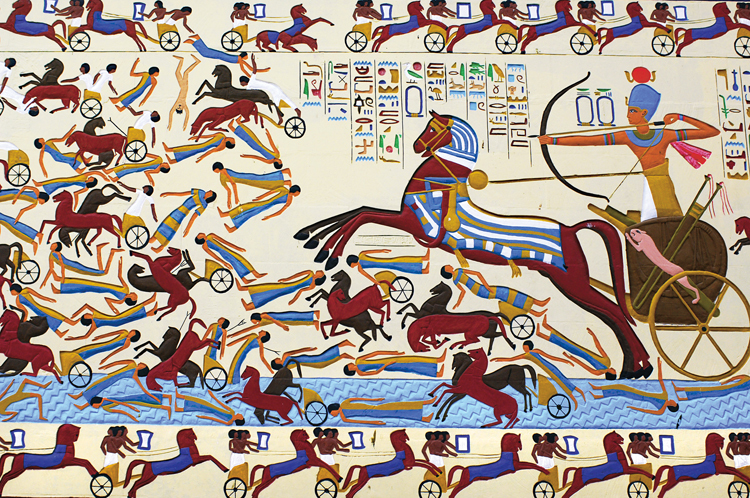
Pharaoh in his chariot defeats the Hyksos

Chariots, a mode of transportation, were used as a weapon by ancient peoples. The Hittites used chariots to crash into enemies, whereas the Egyptians used them to stay away from enemies and attack them by arrows and spears. These vehicles were first made in Mesopotamia by the Sumerians, as four-wheeled wagons each pulled by four donkeys. Every wagon held two people; a driver, and a warrior armed with a spear or an ax. Some historians believe that chariots were first developed in the Eurasian steppes, somewhere near Russia and Uzbekistan. With the introduction of horses, chariots could combine speed, strength and mobility. The Hyksos introduced chariots in Egypt, these chariots were later modified into the Egyptian style, parts were changed and decorated with Egyptian symbols and paintings. However, by the 15th century BCE, Tutmoses III made 1000 chariots for military expedition. Each chariot carried two men, one to drive and one to shoot arrows. Much later, the Egyptians changed their strategy and divided the charioteers into five squadrons, with twenty-five chariots in each and two men in each chariot: a driver and a soldier armed with bows and arrows, a shield, a sword, and a javelin. When the arrows were exhausted they had swords for close combat.

=== The Khopesh sword ===
The Khopesh, also called the Canaanite "sickle-sword", was used mostly by the tribes who lived near Mesopotamia. These tribes, who used to attack the Egyptians occasionally, used the Khopesh as their main weapon. These tribes later started trading with Egyptians and the Egyptians were so impressed by the shape and make of the sword that they decided to adopt it themselves. Ramses II was the first pharaoh to have used the khopesh in warfare during the battle of Kadesh. The Khopesh was designed such that it could be used as an axe, a sword or a sickle. The Khopesh eventually became the most popular sword in all of Egypt and a symbol of royal power and strength. The Assyrian king Adad-nirari I (r. 1307–1275 BCE) used to display this sword during ritual ceremonies, and such curved swords could be seen in Mesopotamian art and paintings. Some of these Khopesh swords were black in colour and came with a full tang. The average length of the Khopesh was around 40 to 60 cm, which is likely why the Mamluk Sultanate based their sword, the Scimitar, off it. This weapon later spread all around the Muslim Empires and to Eastern Europe.

=== Trident ===
The classical Greek civilization had mastered the art of making spears. The trident, a three pronged spear used for fishing, was a form of spear popular with the Greeks. This weapon was used in the east by the Indians who called it trishul (three spears) and by gladiators in Rome known as retarii, or 'net-fighters', in keeping with the historical use of the trident in fishing. These net fighters would cast the net onto their enemies and once their enemies were trapped and helpless in the net, would then use the trident to kill them or inflict serious injuries. The trident is also associated with various gods: Poseidon and his Roman counterpart Neptune were both associated with and often depicted with a trident, and the Hindu god Shiva also wields the trident.

=== Ancient Greek weapons ===
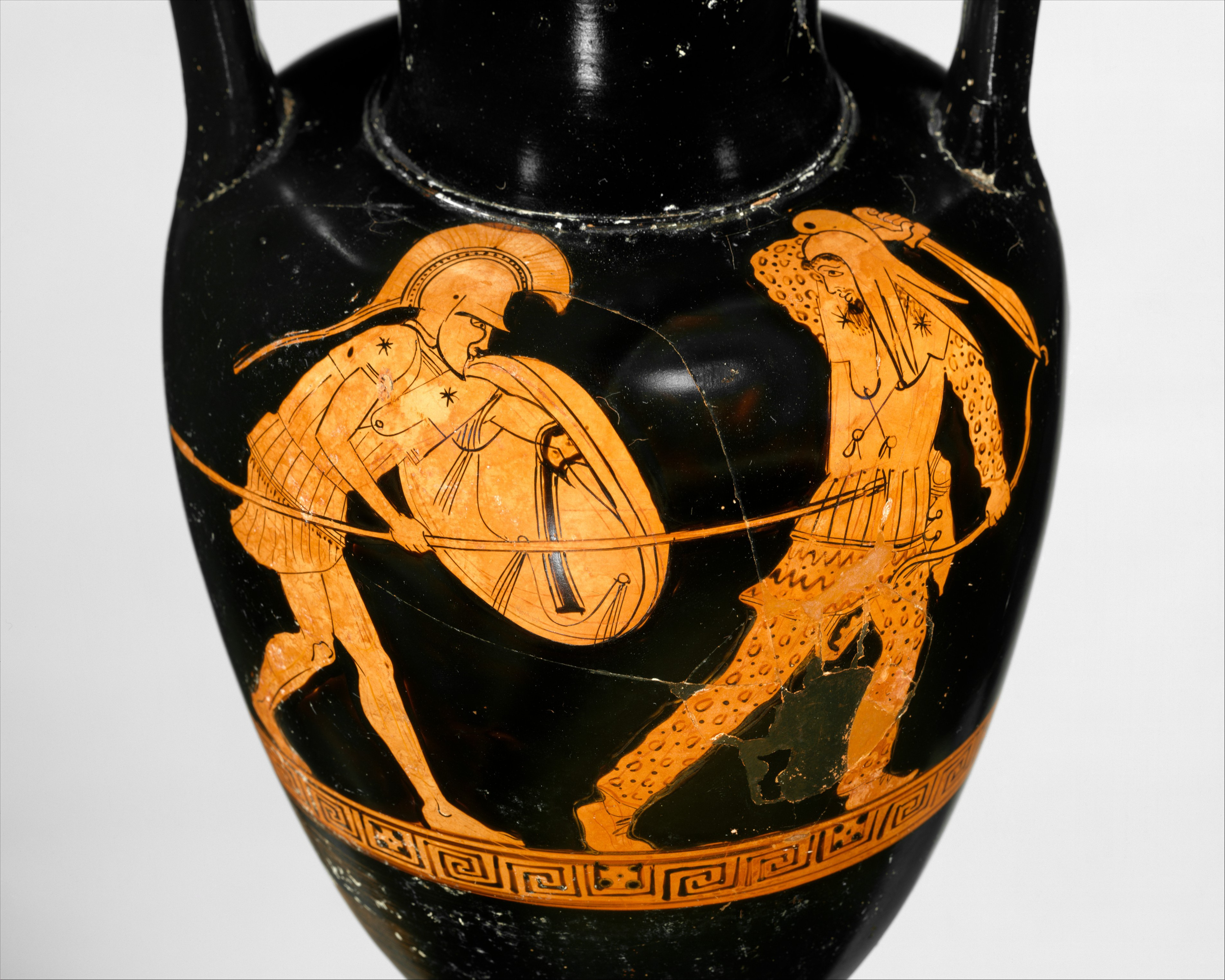
Greek hoplite (left) and Persian warrior (right), fighting each other. Ancient Nolan amphora, 5th century BC.

Ancient Greece was surrounded by hostile neighbours such as Persia, and later Rome. The Greeks had adopted a different pattern of warfare and even fashioned their weapons differently. They had adopted a very strategic style of fighting, researching the strengths and weaknesses of their enemies, and developed their weapons accordingly. After incessant threats of a Persian invasion, the Greeks came together and formed the Delian League; the Spartans were ready for a ground assault while the Athenians relied on their strong navy. Sensing the military might of the Athenians, the city-states and settlers of Asia Minor requested them to lead the league. The Athenians had a formidable navy; they produced an overwhelming number of warships and soldiers and in return demanded tribute from the league members. The Athenians had built dozens of warships known as triremes to defend Greece. The crew consisted of 200 men which included the captain, ten dignitaries who may have been commanders, several archers, a few soldiers, and 170 oarsmen.

When the Persians met the Greek army they outnumbered it three to one, the Persian army consisting of infantry and excellent cavalry. Their tactics were primarily defensive since their main weapon was the bow; they were also supplied with the akinakes, a dagger-like sword. The Greeks used long spears, shields, helmets and breastplates. The Greeks had no cavalry at this time. As soon as the Persian army came to the battleground, the Greeks already started to charge into the enemy lines to avoid the shower of arrows. The Greek shields were so strong that they broke the spears of the Persians, much to their surprise. The long Greek spears, with sharp iron spearhead on a wooden shaft and a bronze butt-spike, helped them break enemy ranks and rout the Persian army. If their spear was broken they used their swords for close combat. Ancient Greeks brought many changes in the technology of warfare.

The victories in the Greco-Persian war at Salamis and Plataea largely ended the Persian threat to the Greek mainland. With the outbreak of the Peloponnesian War, inter-Greek warfare became more significant. The year 424 saw Brasidas's expeditions across the whole of Greece, proving wrong the idea suggested by the Old Oligarch that land forces could not sustain lengthy campaigns against sea powers.

==== The Macedonians ====
The Macedonians emerged as a power in Greece after the crippling of Sparta at the Battle of Leuctra, the ascent to power of King Phillip II who, through a combination of military power and diplomacy, unified the Greek city-states and formed the Corinthian League to fight the Persians. The Macedonians followed the traditional military strategy adopted by the Greek city-states, the phalanx, though unlike Greeks the Macedonian infantry was equipped with the "sarissa", a spear as long as 15 feet with a leaf-shaped spearhead. Unlike the cities of Greece proper, the Macedonian army also had a dedicated cavalry, as the flat plains of Macedon were better suited to cavalry combat than the mountainous country to the south. The Macedonians engineers had developed heavy weapons and artillery pieces, with enough power to breach the gates and walls of a fortification. Torsion catapults were also developed a little later as well as heavy weapons such as the ballistae, and the smaller, and more portable weapons, cheiroballistra were improved by King Philip II and Alexander the Great.

=== The Romans ===
After Rome was sacked by the Senones in 390 BCE, they regrouped and formed an alliance of the city states. They deployed thoroughly trained soldiers in the north western frontiers to protect Rome from further attacks. These soldiers were divided into two groups, Legionaries and Auxiliaries. Legionaries were Roman citizens whereas Auxiliaries were recruited from tribes and allies of Rome. They defeated the Gauls and eventually gained total control of the Italian peninsula as well as the Mediterranean. The Romans never used complex weapons, instead they chose to use the more simple and unusual weapons of warfare. The armor and weapons were used under excellent supervision, great leadership and discipline that enabled the Romans to create superior military forces, both regular and irregular armies including mercenaries and allies, that were able to conquer their opponents.

==== Swords ====
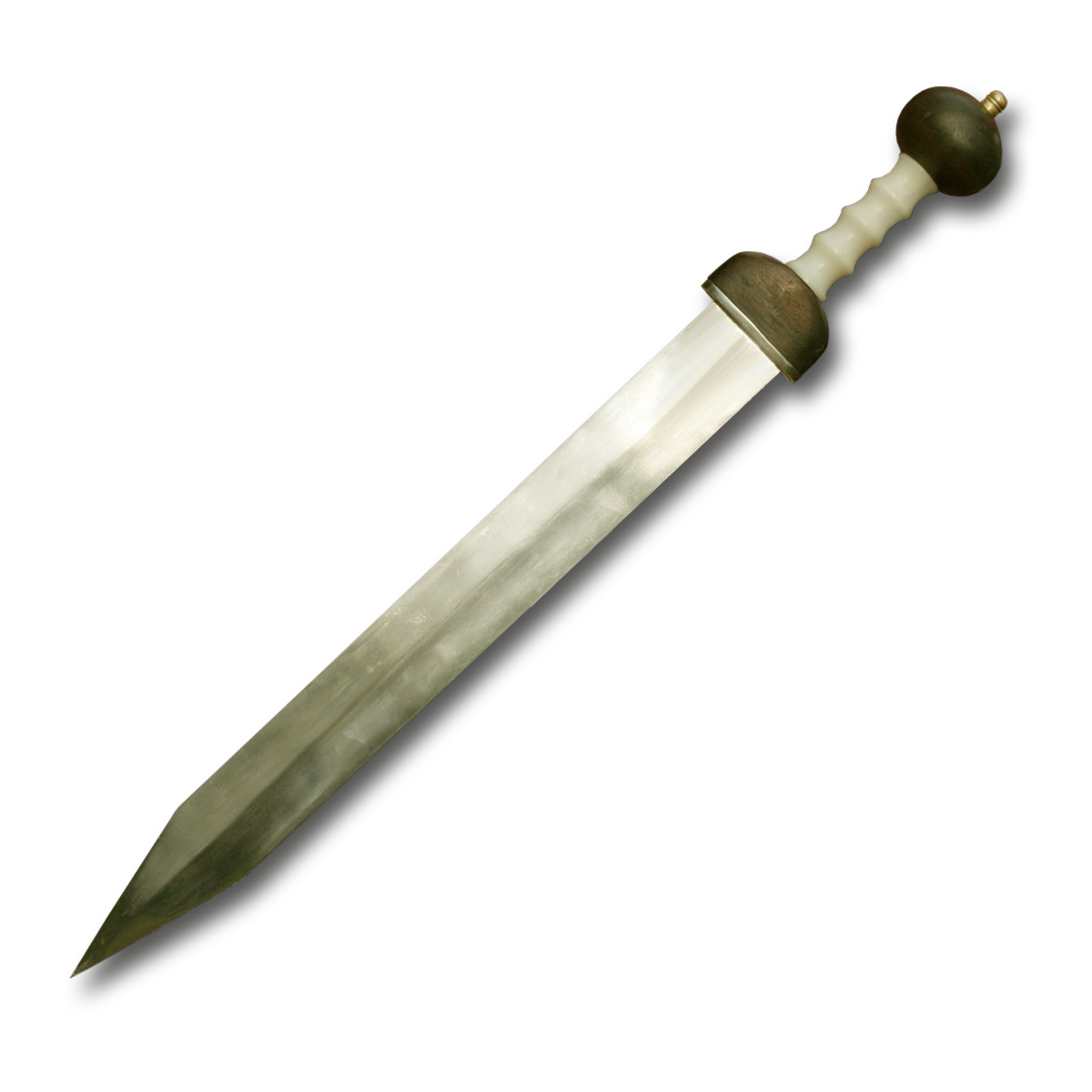
The gladius, one of the primary close-combat weapons utilized by the Roman military

Originating in Spain, the gladius was adopted by the Romans as one of their most commonly used weapons for close combat. Typically 30 cm in length, characterizing a short sword, the term gladius was also applied to longer swords. Though many swords were double-edged for ease of cutting, this was not always the case. In addition, the geometry of the sword's point varied over time due to changing combat styles, but all were tapered to allow for thrusting. The gladius was also suitable for cutting and chopping. It was mainly used for thrusting, and thus had limited effect when wielded from horseback. These swords were made with an iron blade to which a bronze-covered wood, or ivory cross guard, pommel, and grip would be attached. The gladius varied in length and size as Roman soldiers of different ranks used gladius measuring around 34.5 and 64 centimeters. There were other short sword variations that were classified with names other than gladius. One such example is the sica, which was about 40 cm long and had a curved tip. To engage in close combat, Roman soldiers would lead with their shield protected from volleys of arrows or pila and thrust forward with their sword.

==== Spears ====
In addition to short swords, Roman infantry typically carried a spear or other type of polearm. The most common was known as the javelin, a heavy spear that could be either thrown or thrusted. Similar in function to the javelin was the fuscina. Although not used by the Roman military, this fork-like trident was one of the most popular gladiator weapons. A version of the javelin that had a much longer and thinner tip was the pilum, which could pierce armor or shields when thrown. Several pila could be thrown to initiate combat, disrupting the structure and defense of enemy armies and providing an opportunity for close combat, where the gladius would take over. The design of the pilum allowed it to become lodged in an enemy shield. Removing a pilum from a shield was often difficult and time-consuming during combat. In fact, most were not reusable after removal.

==== Catapults ====
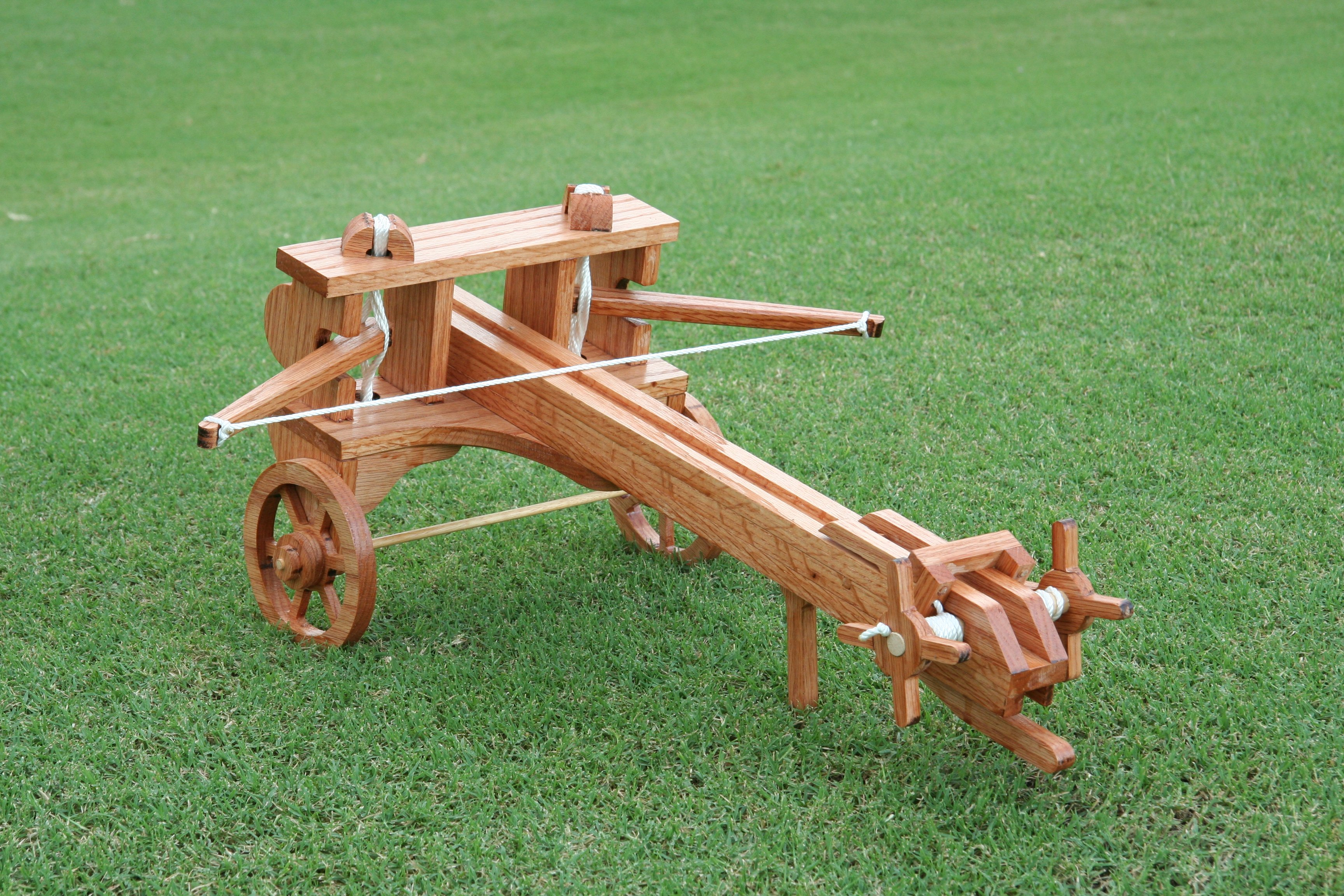
A replica of a Greek/Roman catapult used for launching darts or large arrows

Siege warfare gave the Roman army significant offensive advantages over their enemies. Though the catapult was developed in ancient Greece, the Romans were able to replace the traditional Greek catapult made of wood making the most stressed components out of iron or bronze. This allowed for a reduction in size and also the ability to increase the stress levels to provide more power. Since a detailed understanding of mathematics and mechanics was required to design the catapult, it stands as a prime example of cooperation between ancient science and technology. Additional knowledge in topics like metallurgy and machine design helped to improve the performance of catapults. One example is the addition of machine elements like springs and copper bearings.

It was known that the size of the catapult's components should be proportional to the weight of its intended projectile. As a result, tables relating standard part sizes and common projectile weights were assembled, which drastically increased the efficiency and production rate of catapults. The Roman catapult could be moved and operated by a single soldier, which allowed a more efficient use of soldiers and resources. These machines were torsion-powered and most were used to launch large spherical or dart-like projectiles. However, more creative options were often used. These included poisonous snakes, jars of bees, and dead bodies that were infected with diseases like the plague. The catapult was versatile, and could effectively launch any projectile that fit in its launch bucket.

The Romans also developed an automatic repeating catapult called the scorpion. This was smaller than other catapults but had more moving parts. The rope coils were often made of twisted bovine sinews, horsehair or women's hair. The kinetic power delivered by a catapult was dependent on the diameter of these coils, making the coil diameter the dimensional standard for power rating. This would be similar to how the caliber system is used in modern firearms.

== Early Middle Ages ==
Alaric the Goth charging into Rome with his barbarian troops

The Barbarian tribes from Germania kept penetrating deeper into the Roman territory, some of these tribes were the Osthrogoths, Visigoths, Vandals and Franks. After the death of Marcus Aurelius, Rome became vulnerable to attacks from all directions. The Huns, a tribe said to be from steppe regions of Central Asia started to push other barbarian tribes into Roman territories, the Huns not only attacked other barbarian tribes but eventually attacked Rome. By this time the Roman Empire was divided into East and West. The Huns always fought a battle on horseback as they were not used to infantry lines. Their favourite weapon was the composite bow.

Flavius Aetius forged an alliance with the Visigoths, Alans and the Vandals and provided them with Roman arms and armour to fight against their common enemy, the Huns. His barbarian filled forces defeated the Huns in 410, and the visigoths sacked Rome under the leadership of Alaric I.

=== Military organization ===
After the defeat of Western Roman Empire, the Eastern Roman Empire or Byzantine empire held on. The barbarian kingdoms had already set up their kingdoms in place, they started the process of recruiting and the advancement of soldiers. A warrior was highly respected according to the barbarian tradition, a brave warrior was often rewarded by allotting land, titles and other benefits, and these land owners later became medieval nobles.

=== Weapons of the barbarians ===
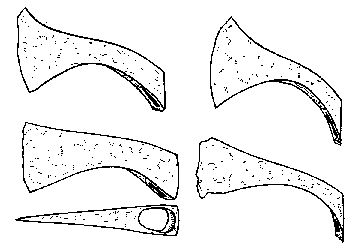
Frankish throwing axe of the 5th and 6th century AD

Many barbarians had served in the Roman army and so used similar weapons to those in that army. However, after a brief period, the barbarian tribes including the Vandals, the Ostrogoths, Visigoths, and Franks started to develop and make their own weapons. Archers began to shoot iron-tipped arrows, the cavalry and infantry both initiated the use of longer two-edged swords. Meanwhile, the Franks used a variety of weapons, they chose not to wear their armor and instead carried more weapons. In 470 Sidonius Apollinaris recalls his first meeting with Frankish soldiers and according to him, the Franks hung their swords onto their shoulders, they also carried with them barbed lances and throwing axes. Many Frankish warriors also did not wear helmets. They carried their traditional double-edged axe and never carried any missile weapons.

Amongst all the barbarian tribes, Merovingian kingdom of the Franks became the most powerful realm in Western Europe. Most of the power was exercised by the military lords who eventually gained total control of the Merovingian kingdom in late 600 AD. Pippin II, who had gained total control of the Merovingian kingdom passed mayorships to his illegitimate son, Charles Martel, in 714. Charles Martel was responsible for modernization of the Frankish army and the defeat of Muslims at the Battle of Tours. During the battle, the Franks had carried with them swords and axes, the iron heads of their weapons were exceedingly sharp, and their axes were forged from a single piece of iron. However, by the end of the 7th century production of axes ceased as the number of skilled axe throwers started dwindling.

=== The Byzantine armoury ===
During the reign of Justinian, the emperor of Constantinople, the Byzantine empire became military active. He sent a huge army to re-capture the North African provinces from the Vandals, and by 534 AD, the Byzantine general Belisarius had destroyed the Vandal power and proceeded to march through Italy to conquer Rome from the Ostrogoths. By 565, the Byzantines wiped the Ostrogoths from Italy. The Byzantines were witnessing great advances in military engineering, possessing a highly disciplined military force and military technicians who contributed to the development of siege weapons that the civilized world had never seen.

In around 672, an incendiary substance known as Greek Fire was invented. Greek fire was sprayed from early flamethrowers on ships known as dromons. Researchers have been unable to duplicate this substance today, ships were set alight by the Greek fire and it had the capability to kill large number of warriors inside the ship with one shot. Some of the early devices used by the Byzantines were torsion powered engines used to shoot arrows with greater intensity. The Byzantine military engineers were learning and developing more sophisticated siege weapons, and by the 10th century they had adopted engineering techniques used by the Muslims.

=== Weapons of the Mediterranean ===
The Islamic world had already advanced way ahead of others in military engineering which, according to historians, was due to trade relations with China. The Islamic world had learned that the Chinese technology, was known to be superior to that of the Greeks or the Romans. Arab army generals were encouraging the use of new technology and inherited a highly sophisticated tradition of siege warfare.

The Trebuchet, capable of throwing huge stones and piles of rocks was said to have been invented in the Middle East by the Muslim engineers. The Trebuchet was probably copied from the Chinese huo-pa'o, which had been adopted by the Mongols and carried west by them. Some Trebuchets were used to throw dead horses into a besieged city to spread disease. The Muslims had adopted the technology and traditions of those whom they conquered. Like the Syrians, the Iranians and later the Byzantines, the Muslims had also attacked Byzantine using the most advanced siege weapons. In the mid-8th century, Caliph Marwan II of Syria had more than 80 stone-throwing machines stored with him. The Abbasid Caliphate who had set their capital in Baghdad rather than Syria had specialized in mangonel operations and stationed these devastation military geniuses in all their fortresses.

=== Chinese gunpowder weapons ===
Chinese people had witnessed conflicts and constant warfare all across China. Fifty years after the fall of the Tang dynasty, China witnessed five successive dynasties in the north along with a dozen small nations in the south in a short timespan. The quick rise and fall of these countries and the fragmented nature is a result of the rise of warlords towards the later half of the Tang dynasty.

In 960, Zhao Kuangyin staged a coup of his own to take over the dominant northern dynasty of the later Zhou, and founded the Song dynasty. He was able to finally reunite all the fragmented states of the south and put an end to the problem of military coups that had plagued China for the last century. The Song established its capital at Kaifeng on the Yellow river. It was during the reign of this dynasty that the Chinese started to produce gunpowder using saltpeter, sulfur and carbon. Some historians believe that the Chinese did not consider gunpowder a particularly important weapon, though in fact they were the first people to systematically use gunpowder as weapons on a wide scale. Even the Arabs, who had probably been using gunpowder much earlier than the Europeans, referred to potassium nitrate as 'Snow from China' Arabic: ثلج الصين thalj al-ṣīn and the Persians referred to it as "Chinese salt" or "salt from Chinese salt marshes" (namak shūra chīnī Persian: نمک شوره چيني). From about 1000 AD it had been mostly used in the form of firecrackers, and was used to improve existing weapons (for example), attached on spears for a shock burst upon engagement, or on arrows so they can fly faster mid air or be shot off in large salvos without the need of bows. In the 12th century, the Chinese were using crude hand grenades and were starting to use the earliest forms of rockets and cannons in addition to the aforementioned firecracker weapons.

== Later Middle Ages ==
=== The Normans ===
The Norman knights that invaded England, and defeated the Saxons at Hastings in 1066, dressed in chainmail and swinging swords from horseback, made history. William the Conqueror had successfully landed with his army of Normans consisting of an infantry composed of spearmen, swordsmen, and archers in Britain to claim his authority over the throne of England, Norman cavalry was well equipped with maces, axes, swords and boiled leather armours.

=== Advanced warfare ===
Western Europe by this time had already reached a level of military sophistication, the Arabs had even started to adopt manjaniq ifranji or manjaniq firanji, the Frankish or European trebuchet, a stone-throwing engine. The Europeans were by all means trying to outclass the Byzantines, the Indians and the Arabs in siege technology. The Mongols on the other hand had brought about a revolution in siege warfare. They had learned the art of making siege weapons while conquering northern China, recovering some mangonels, trebuchets and rams from Chinese engineers.

=== The Crusades ===
The Normans and the Byzantines were successful in driving out the Muslim invaders from the Greek Islands, Southern Italy and Sicily. Though these were little military operations the Europeans, assuming that the Muslims were vulnerable, embarked on a mission to recapture the holy land lost by them centuries before. However, a powerful tribe from the mid-Asian steppes, the Seljuk Turks emerged and started to massacre the Christian pilgrims in Syria. Responding to these attacks, the Byzantines fought a battle against the Seljuk Turks, the battle of Manzikert, where they were defeated resulting in the Byzantines pulling back all their armies from Asia Minor. Byzantine emperor Alexius I Comnenus, requested for aid from Christians, he petitioned Pope Urban II to aid the Byzantines in regaining their lost territories. Pope Urban II summoned the Christian armies in 1095 and sent them to recapture the holy Land from the hands of the Muslims.

Not much is known about the weapons that were being produced in Western Europe at the time of Crusades, but it is evident that their cavalry used lances. The Europeans armies also used crossbows excessively, it was said to be the best known infantry weapon used by the Europeans. By the late 13th century, the power of crossbows increased, infantry weapons of the Crusaders varied in shape, sizes and quality. Apart from spears, swords and daggers, foot soldiers were equipped with an extraordinary array of pole-arms, often reflecting their place of origin. The double edged sword was extensively used by both foot knights and mounted knights.

The Islamic armies too had a sophisticated military organization, their armies consisted of the Central Asian Turkish Mamluk or the Ghulam infantry. Further, local Turks, Kurds, Arabs, Armenians, Persians, were also recruited from all over the Mediterranean. Their weapons were no different from the crusaders, using daggers, axes, spears, bows and arrows. The bows were differently crafted, using multiple strips of different kinds of wood glued together to maximize the range and penetration power of said bow. Their swords also had a slightly different design, Muslim cavalry used swords for close combat and their armour was often worn beneath their cloths, to protect themselves from the sun overheating the iron pieces. Muslim troops also carried with them round and kite shaped shields.

=== Hundred Years War ===
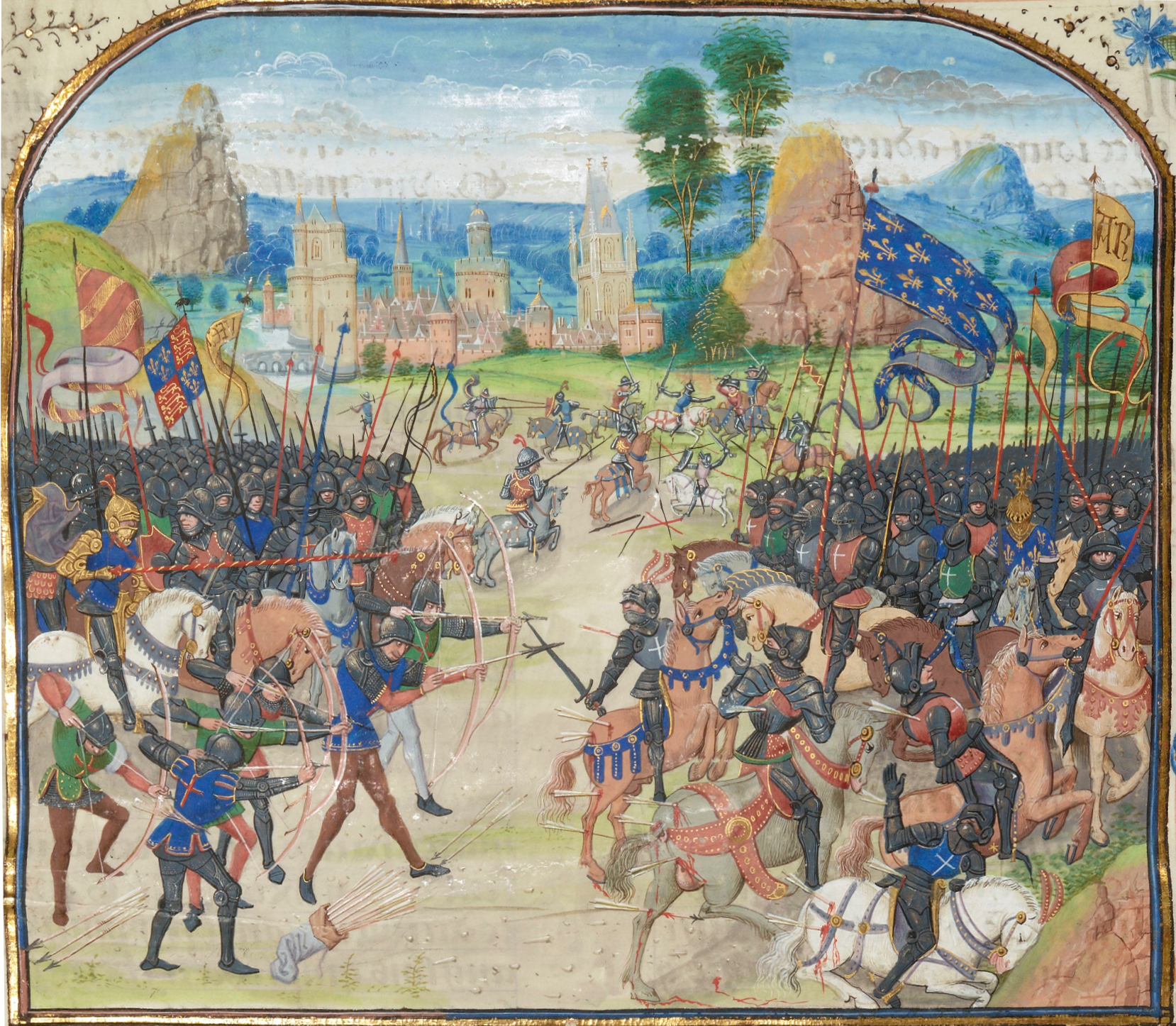
Battle of Poitiers 1356 shown here in a miniature from Froissart's Chronicles

The Hundred Years' War was a series of big and small wars fought between France and England from 1337 to 1453. In the year 1337, the French King Philip VI demanded that the provinces under the English rule, Gascony and Guyenne be given back to the French. However, English king, Edward III denied this demand which led to a war between the two. The English had their eyes on the wool industry in Flanders, moreover they had a stable government and efficient soldiers ready to fight the French.

During this period, most of the Europeans armies relied mainly on infantry, the infantry dominated armies were taking a toll on cavalry dominated armies. Digging ditches, constructing wagon fortresses, or flooding already marshy ground, so that the enemy could attack from only one direction, were some of the methods employed by both the armies during the Hundred Years' War. In the final phase of the war, gunpowder was also used for the first time in Western Europe. Jean and Gaspard Bureau's effective organization of artillery weapons enabled the French army in open battlefields as well as siege warfare. At Castillon, the French army annihilated the English, effectively using cannons, handguns and heavy cavalry.

=== Longbow ===
The English longbow was greatly responsible for making England a major military power in the late medieval period, the English had introduced this deadly longbow during the Battle of Crecy. King Edward III was ravaging the countryside during the invasion of France, King Philip VI of France intercepted the English near the town of Crecy. The French had easily outnumbered the English. Apart from armoured knights the French army also had nearly 4,000 Genoese crossbowmen. But the English archers outnumbered the Genoese and rained arrows, the English could shoot five times faster than the Genoese crossbowmen. When the French mounted knights tried to infiltrate into the English lines, the longbowmen turned their attention to them and started to shoot, resulting in chaos. The horses started to crash into each other, cavalry was destroyed and the French army annihilated. The longbow was made of a simple piece of wood, but its design was fairly sophisticated. The bow's back, the part facing away from the archer, was the more flexible sapwood, that allowed the bow to be bent more sharply without breaking or causing any further damage.

=== Cavalry weapons ===
The basic objective of a cavalry knight was to charge into enemy lines and create chaos. At this time, the old shields and armours were replaced by more sophisticated and advanced shields and armour. Lances were used by the mounted knights for initial charge, after the initial charge and annihilation of the enemy front lines, the lances were discarded and swords, axes or war hammer were used for close combat.

=== Gunpowder weapons ===
The invention of gunpowder weapons revolutionized siege warfare, Gunpowder is said to have been conceived in China. It was when the Mongols, after invading China, went on to subdue Japan. Their ships sunk from being hit by a typhoon, resulting in half of their army drowning at sea. Marine archaeology has revealed that the Mongols were carrying gunpowder in ceramic pots, similar pots with ignited fuses had been shot from mechanical artillery against the Japanese defenders. Even the old Japanese paintings show the Japanese samurai defending themselves against bombs and rockets hurled by the invaders.

Some historians have observed that only 14 percent of men in Europe owned guns, and over half of those guns were unusable during the later Middle Ages. The invention of gunpowder weapons replaced only catapults and onagers; the change was slow. Buying guns in those days was a costly affair: the cost of one gun was the equivalent of two months' pay for a skilled artisan. By 1450, inventors improved the make of the gun and introduced the matchlock gun. Though inventors came with new technology, the process of reloading after every shot was very time-consuming; by the time they were reloading the gun, the cavalry would charge and annihilate the entire unit of shooters.

== Early modern period ==
Medieval weapons continued to be used during the Renaissance, such as in the Islamic gunpowder empires and the English Civil War. These weapons included the guisarme, halberd, sword, mace, and partisan. The halberd was a traditional weapon by the Swiss, consisting of an axe-blade topped with a spike, with a hook or pick on the back, on top of a long pole. This weapon was mostly used by foot soldiers against cavalry. Halberds became obsolete when improved pikes started to be produced in huge numbers. Meanwhile, the partisan was introduced in England in the 14th century and was used excessively and extensively in Europe and especially in France. The original partisan was spear with small wings added below it.

The sword remained the most popular weapon during Renaissance, however it underwent many changes. Various extensions were added designed to protect the hands of its owner. The two-handed sword was widely used in Western Europe, being employed both by the rich and the poor. The armies during this period were usually equipped with double edged swords, halberd, arquebus, crossbows and improvised axes. The Spanish tercio used pike, javelins, bucklers, arquebus and muskets. Swords were the secondary weapons for close range assaults.

In light of the Turkish fleet's looming danger on Venice, Leonardo da Vinci was inspired to make designs for a submarine, a snorkel and a diving suit for underwater saboteurs. They were not realized as the Venetian authorities deemed such inventions unnecessary. After returning to Florence, Cesare Borgia chose Leonardo as his military engineer in 1502. Leonardo sketched new devices for war, such as a pointed artillery projectile, which bore close resemblance to an aerial bomb.

=== Siege guns ===
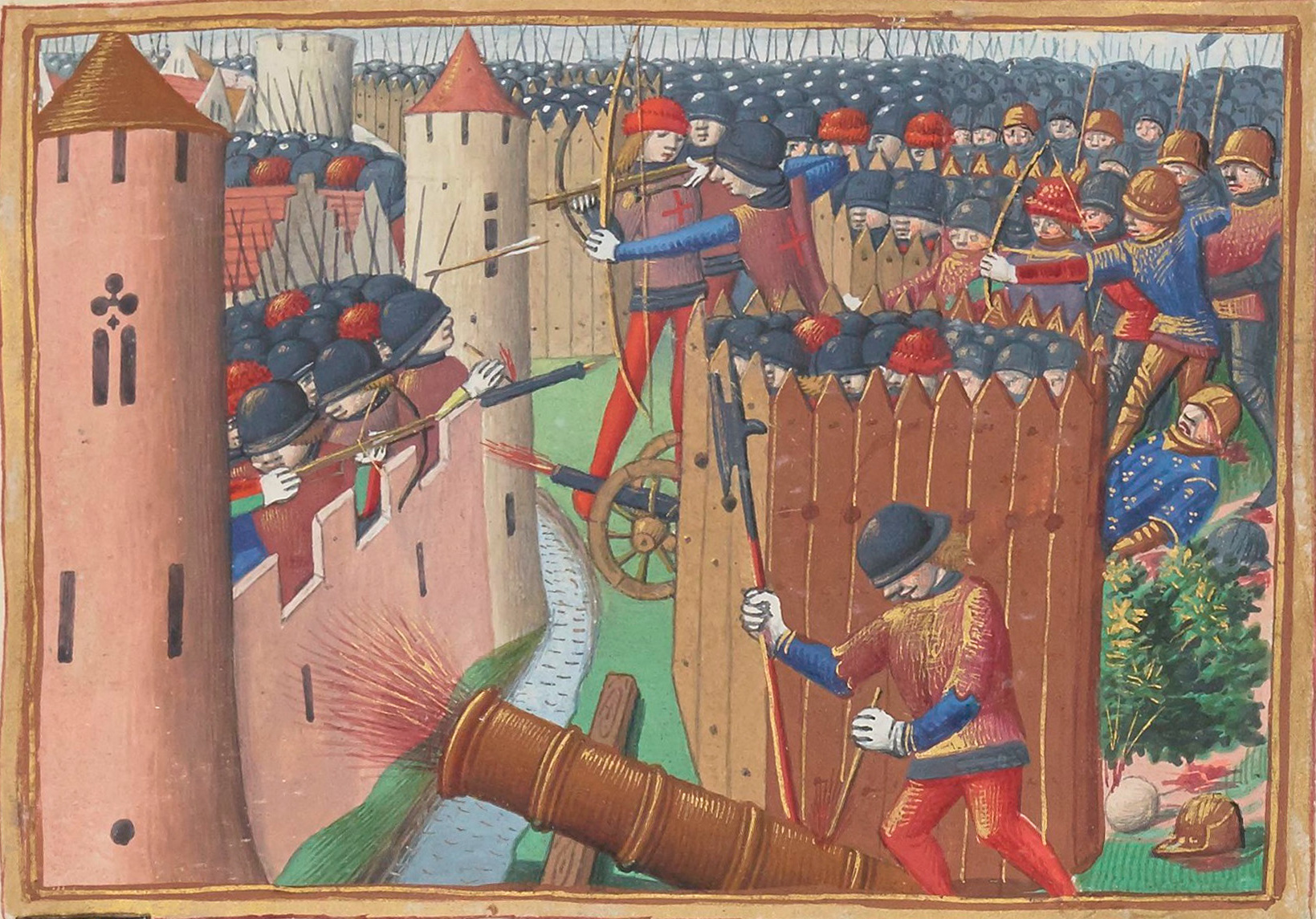
The first Western image of a battle with cannon: the Siege of Orléans in 1429. From Les Vigiles de Charles VII

China was the first place where cannons were used for battle. Metal cannons were manufactured and mounted on the Great Wall of China to protect it from the Mongolian hordes, the Mongols learned this technology and made cannons to invade Korea. In 1593 cannons were used most effectively in the Siege of Pyongyang, Ming warriors made cannons to fight the Japanese, the battle was won by the Ming warriors because the Japanese lacked cannons or any sort of gunpowder weapons.

During the siege of Constantinople in 1453, Mehmed the Conqueror, sultan of Turkey, ordered his Hungarian engineer, Urban to develop the biggest guns ever seen. Once these huge guns, cannons or bombards were in position, the walls of Constantinople came tumbling down. The introduction of such bombards had a profound effect on the European society, engineers started to design their walls keeping in mind the danger the walls could have when facing the newly introduced bombards.

== Modern period ==
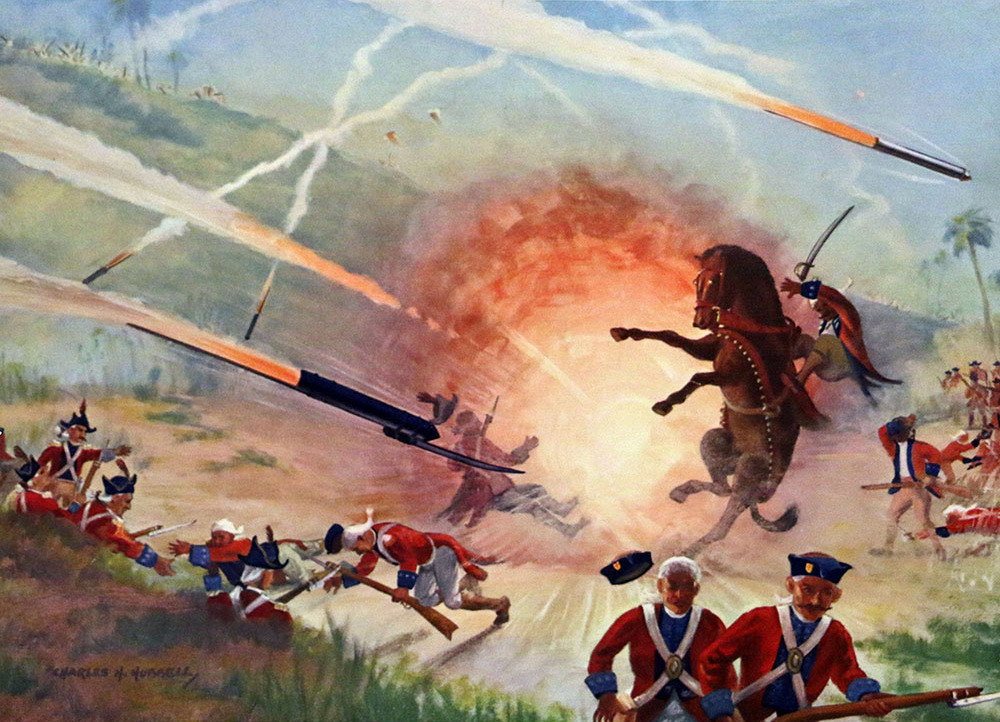
A painting showing the Tipu Sultan's army fighting the British forces with Mysorean rockets.

The use of the bayonet, beginning in the 17th century, allowed soldiers to use muskets as pikes in close combat. The flintlock, invented slightly earlier, made firearms more reliable. Cartridges were also invented around this time, and made existing firearms easier to load.

Submarine technology gradually advanced during the 17th and 18th centuries. Early submarines were mounted with spars and powered by hand cranks. By the mid-19th century, self-propelled torpedoes started to be used. They were largely ineffective until the end of the 19th century, when electricity and internal combustion engines could make them more powerful .

The ruler of the Kingdom of Mysore's based in South India, Tipu Sultan pioneered a number of advanced weapons, including the rocket artillery and the Mysorean rockets, which were later used by Napoleone Bonaparte and the British Empire.

In 1803, the British began using shrapnel.

Rifling was invented in 1498, but it was not practical until the 19th century.

As well as these advances in firearms and artillery technology, new repeating firearms began to emerge on the battlefield. As soon as matchlocks appeared, there were attempts to create non-muzzleloading firearms. Early attempts such as the Ferguson rifle proved to be too complicated for regular soldiers. By 1836 a German gunsmith Johann Nicolaus von Dreyse invented the Dreyse needle rifle, the first bolt-action rifle, which the Prussian Army adopted for service in 1848. In 1866 during the Austro-Prussian War after the decisive Prussian victory at the Battle of Königgrätz it was obvious that muzzle-loading rifles were ineffective in battle. Soon after, nations all around Europe began adopting breech-loaders and converting their existing service rifles to breech-loaders. Such rifles include the British Snider Rifle and the French Chassepot Rifle. These new rifles, along with the invention of the revolver (patented in 1836) and the advent of machine in the 1860s, displayed the need for the way battles were fought to change. However, it was only until the First World War that military leaders around the world adapted new tactics to employ these weapons.

=== 20th century ===
This century saw a large increase in weapons innovation, but also their ability to adversely affect the Earth globally.

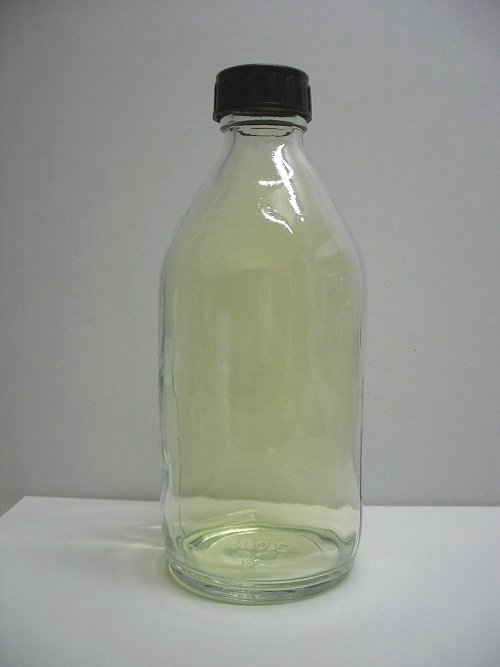
Chlorine gas in a bottle, the first chemical weapon ever used in warfare

Chemical weapons were first used on a large scale on the battlefield in World War I, starting from 1914, despite existing international conventions that prohibited the use of such weapons.

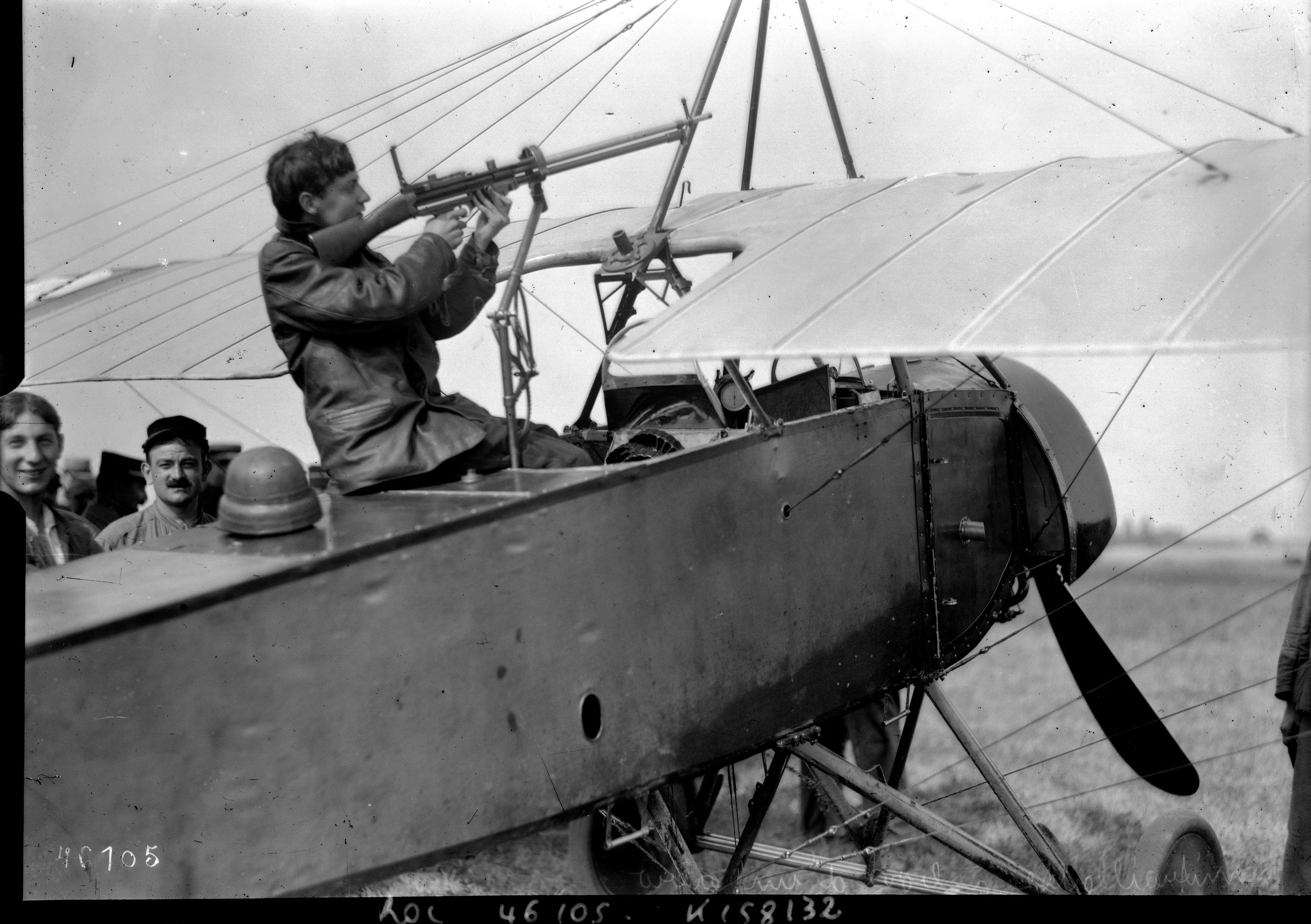
A photo of the Mitrailleuse on French Morane Saulnier L parasol monoplane (Not the Exact plane, this is only a reference image)

In 1915, the first propeller plane that could safely fire a machine gun through the propeller blades was invented, it was called the Morane-Saulnier Type L "Parasol". This led to later dogfights during World War I. Tanks were also used for the first time during World War I, but they were often slow and unreliable at first. However, they did allow more mobility in the war. Early tanks were mounted with machine guns and light artillery. Armored vehicles with wheels had been used earlier, but they could not cross trenches. Tanks were used a lot more and in greater numbers in World War II.

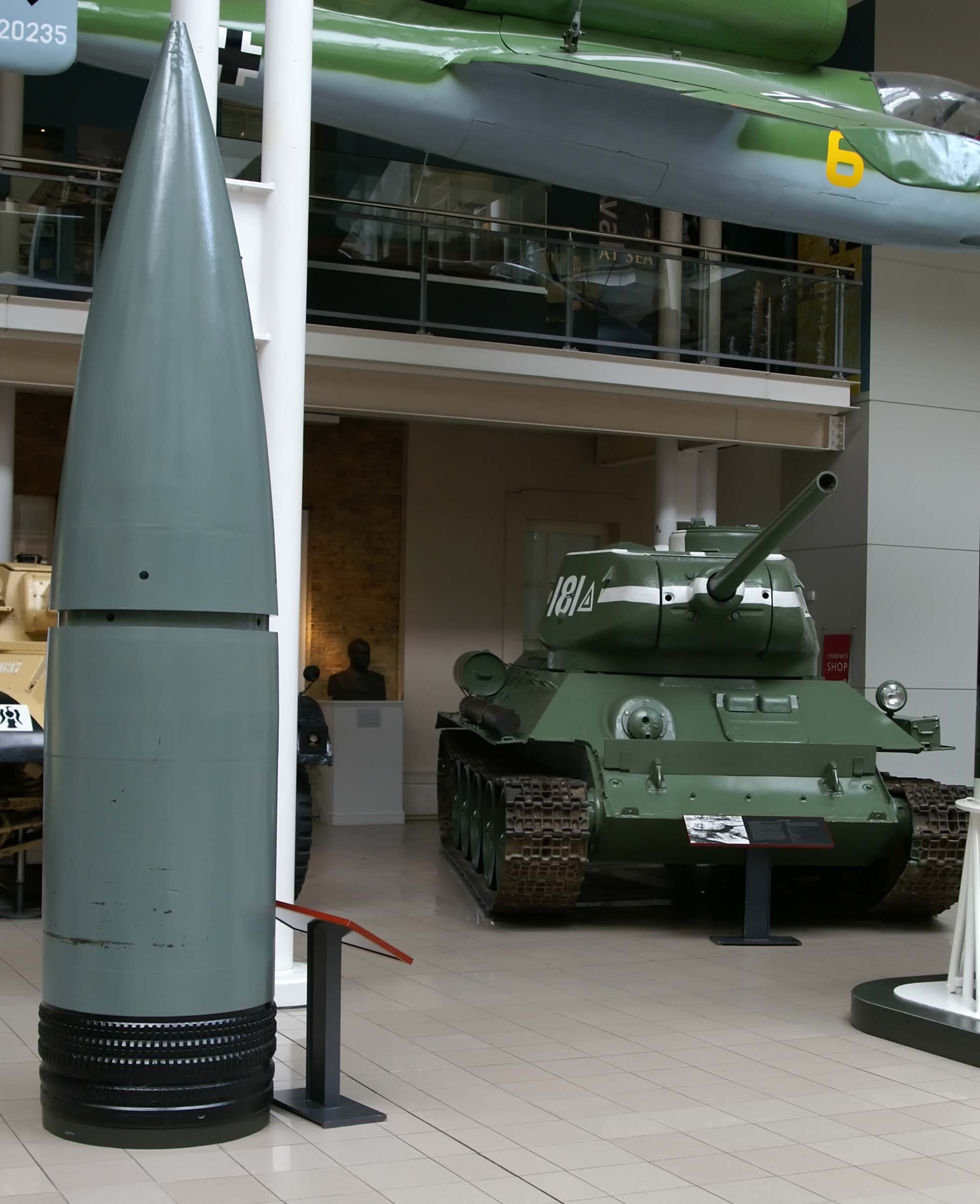
A photo of the Schwerer Gustav's Shell next to a Soviet T34-85 for a sense of scale

The largest railway gun and the largest calibre-rifled weapon ever built and used in combat was the Schwerer Gustav. It was designed in 1937 and was in service from 1941–1945 to destroy the French Maginot line. It was a 800mm cannon that could fire both AP and HE munitions. The shells had a reload rate of 1 shell per 30–45 minutes to reload (roughly 14 a day). It was also the largest Wunderwaffe ever built.

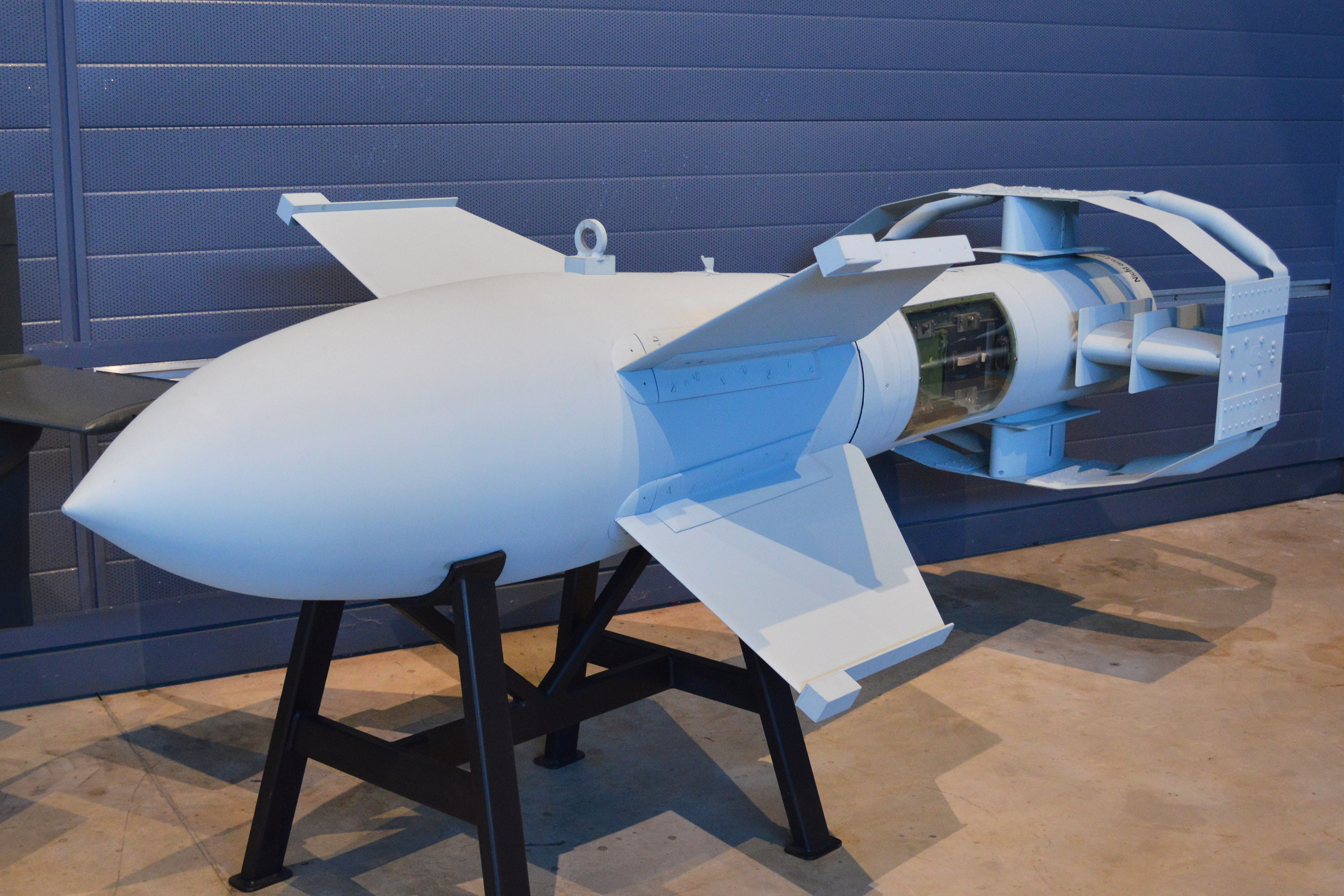
Ruhrstahl X-1 (Fritz-X) – taken at NASM Udvar-Hazy Center

The first weapon designed to be guided to target is the German Fritz-X anti-ship bomb. Ever since, more and more armed forces adopted weapons that are guided by electronics, human assistance or inertial guidance for wide range of purposes, including UCAVs.

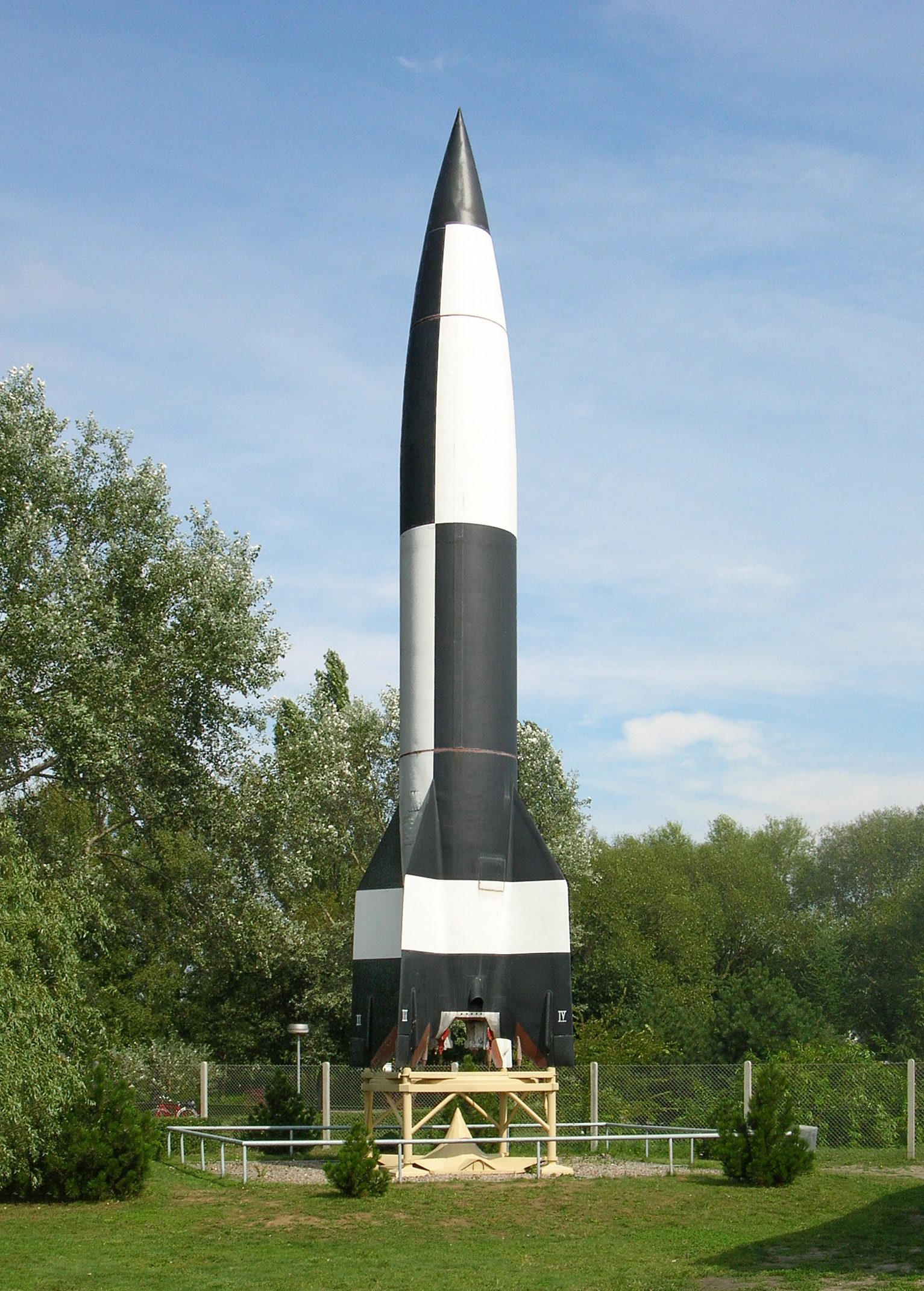
V2-Rocket in the Peenemünde Museum

The first weapon confirmed to reach outer space were the German V-2 rockets in 1944, which were also among the first long-range ballistic missiles. V-2 rockets also led to the Space Race and eventually the Apollo 11 Moon landing.

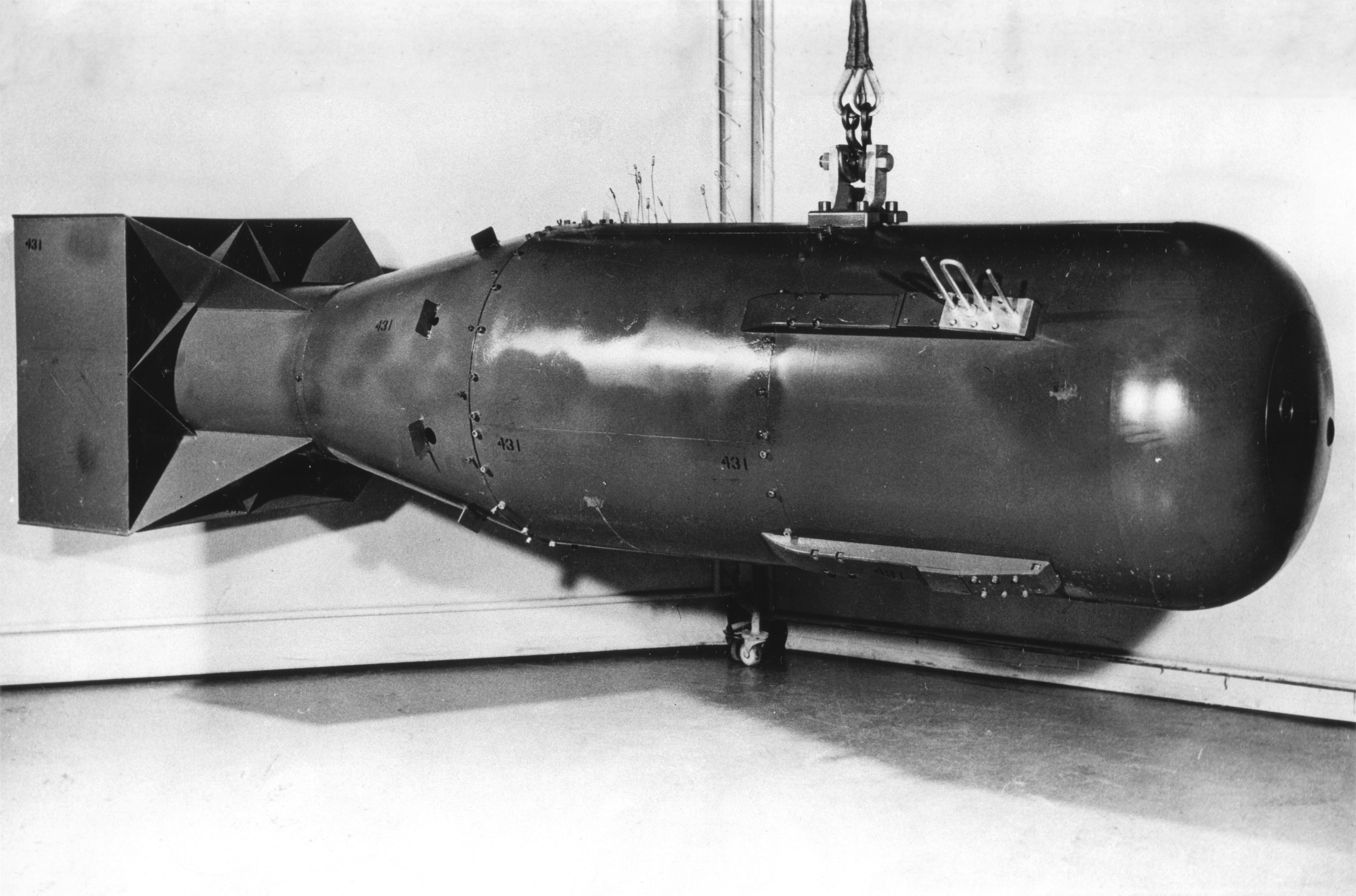
Photograph of a Little Boy atomic bomb, the same type of weapon dropped on Hiroshima, Japan, in August 1945. This was the first photograph of a Little Boy bomb casing to ever be released by the U.S. government (it was declassified in 1960). This photograph is of a postwar Little Boy unit, and is not the exact bomb dropped over Japan

The first atomic bombs were tested and used in warfare in 1945. No nuclear weapons have been used in warfare since, due to the added risk of nuclear holocaust. They remain the most powerful man-made weapons ever built.

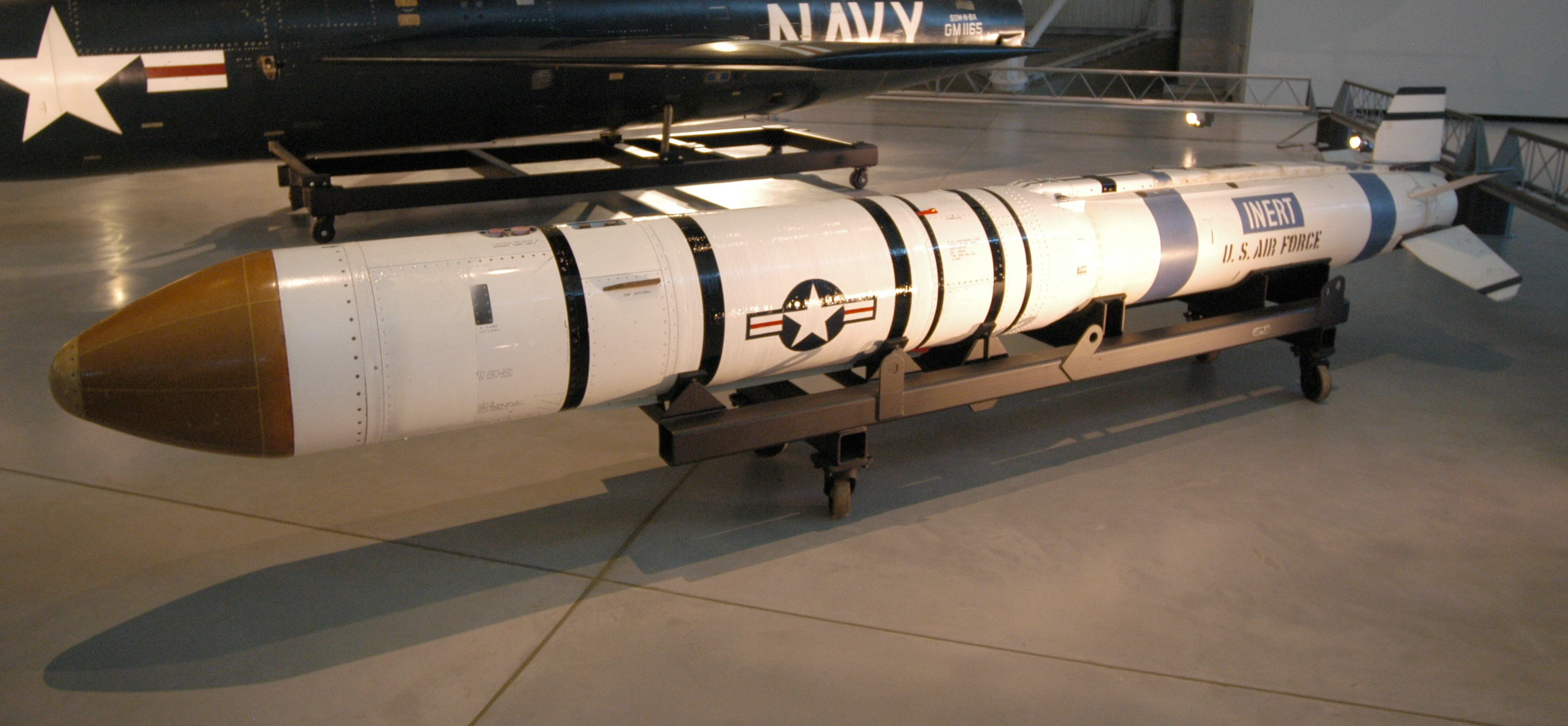
An ASM-135 ASAT anti-satellite missile on display at the Steven F. Udvar-Hazy Center in Chantilly, Virginia

The first weapons designed to attack targets in space were developed by both the Soviet Union and the United States during the Cold War, particularly with their respective anti-satellite missiles.

From 26 August 1966 to 21 March 1990 South Africa was in a border war with communist fighters in Angola. From November 4, 1977, to 1994 South Africa was under international embargo, forbidding the import of weapons, hence leading to a growth in domestic weapon production. The Olifant MBT, derived from the British centurion, was considered the most advanced version of the Centurion tank with systems like a Laser Rangefinder and M111 APFSDS, which were found on the OlifantMk1A and the OlifantMk1B. These systems are still operated today with the modern OlifantMk2. Built in 1988, the G6 Rhino was the first 155mm wheeled howitzer. It was the fastest mobile artillery system, in the sense that it allowed for swift hit-and-run tactics.

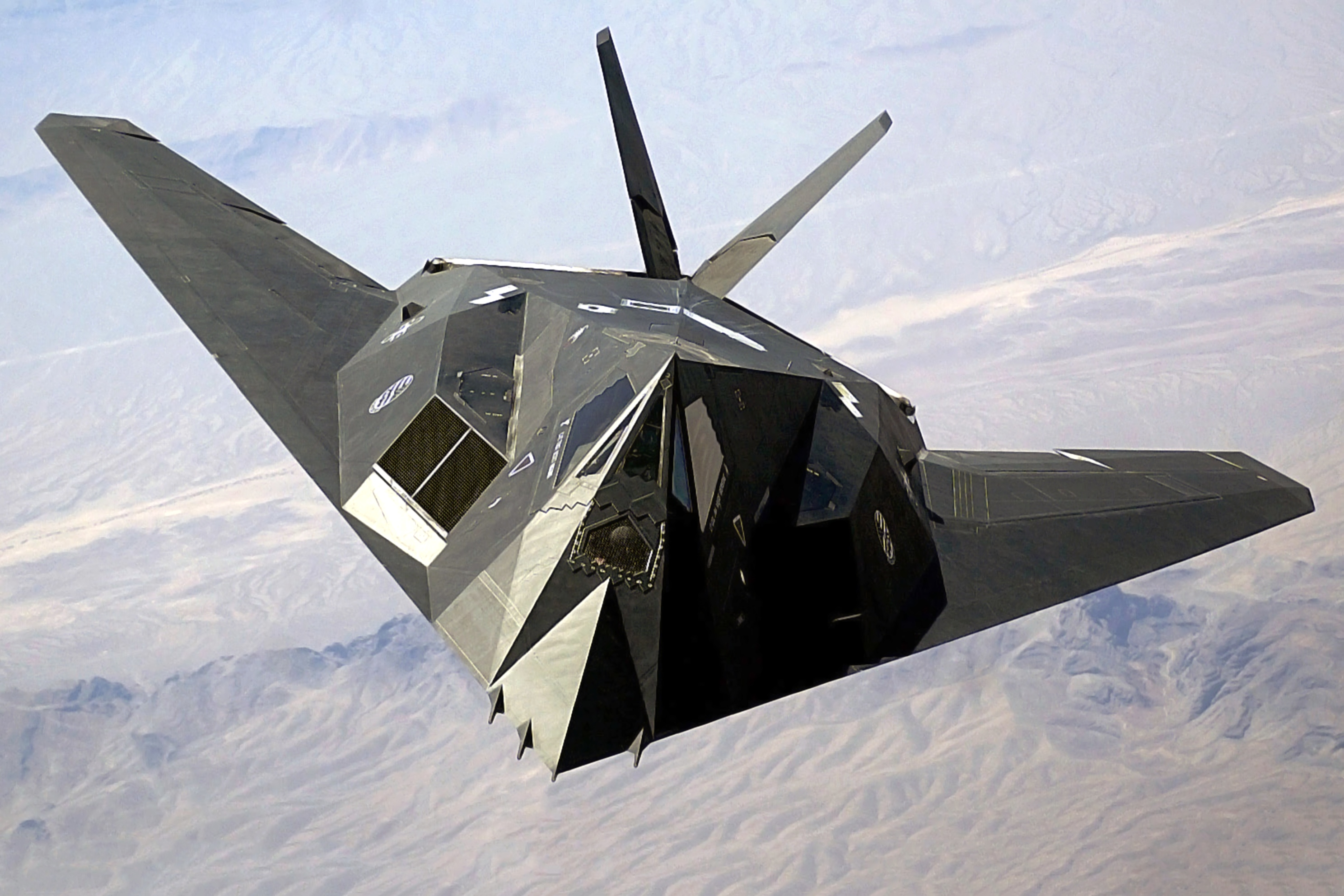
A photo of the American F-117 Nighthawk

Development of the first stealth aircraft, F-117 Nighthawk began in the 1970s to counter Soviet SAM systems that were rapidly advancing. The F-117 was manufacture from 1981 to 1990 and was invisible to almost every SAM system in the world at the time. It could carry 2 GBU-12 Paveway II Bombs, 2 JDAM's and 1 B61 Nuclear Warhead. Although the F-117 was retired in 2008, it is still being used as a training aircraft as of 2026, while publicly considered as one of the best stealth aircraft of all time despite being the oldest.

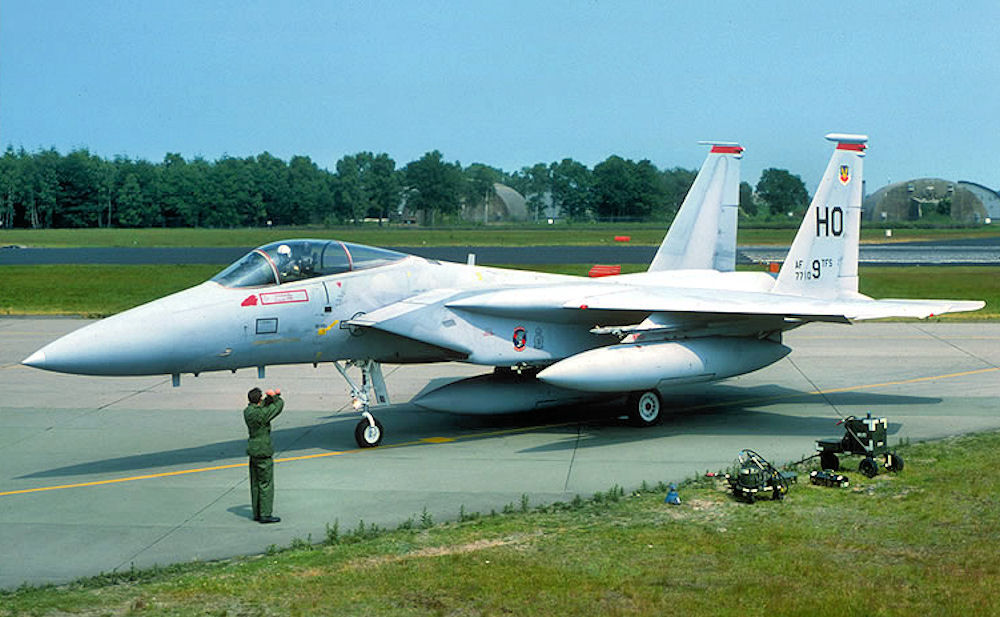
A photo of the American McDonnell Douglas F-15A-19-MC Eagle 77-0109

On September 13, 1985, the first aircraft to ever shoot down a satellite took place. The Modified F-15A-17-MC (F-15A) piloted by Major Wilbert D. "Doug" Pearson, nicknamed the "Celestial Eagle", shot down a P78-1 Satellite using the new ASM-135A anti-satellite (ASAT) missile during a vertical climb at 38,100 feet to destroy the satellite in low Earth orbit. The missile destroyed the satellite at 345 miles (555 km).

=== 21st century ===
This century saw increased use of guided weapons, to reduce the risk of soldier fatalities and to increase effectiveness.

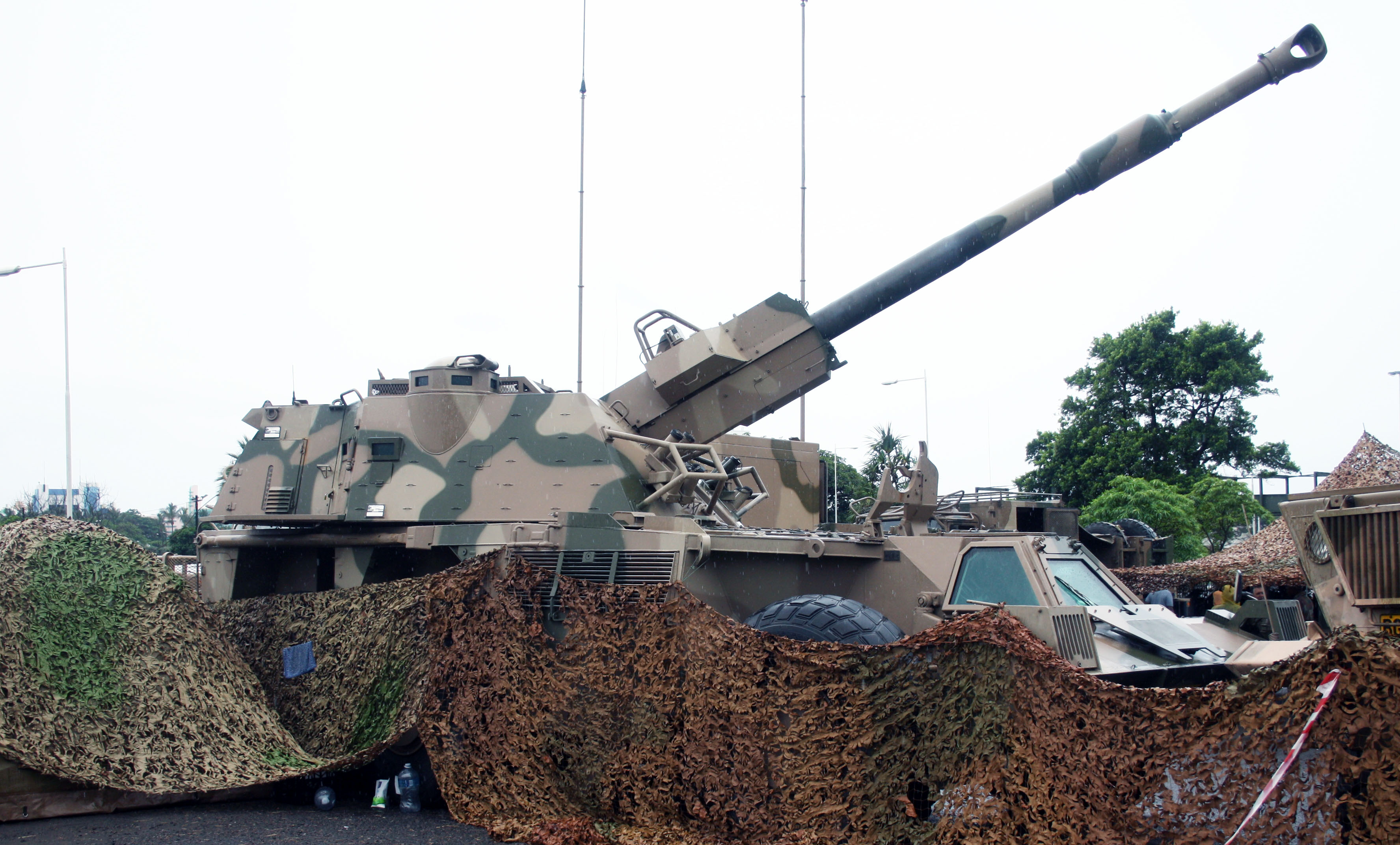
A photo of the South African G6 Howitzer during SANDF Armed Forces Day in 2017

In November 2019, the G6-52 155mm self-propelled howitzer broke the world record for the longest 155mm artillery shot, reaching a range of 76.28 kilometers, which significantly surpassed the typical ranges of conventional 155mm artillery, achieved in collaboration with Rheinmetall Denel Munition in South Africa. This record-breaking shot was made using a specialized velocity-enhanced long-range projectile (V-LAP) and a special top-charge. The South African G6 Howitzer had already broken such a record previously; in September 2001, the G6 achieved a range of 53.6 km using the new V-LAP, effectively breaking the world record twice.

The first practical laser weapon, called the Laser Weapon System, was built by the United States Navy and installed on the USS Ponce. It is designed to destroy fast and small targets such as simple incoming missiles, primitive fast attack craft and drones at very short distance.

There are new physical principles weapons being created using emerging technologies such as super-high frequencies or psychophysics.

== See also ==
- History of military technology
- Native American weaponry

== Footnotes ==
=== References ===
- DeVries, Kelly & Smith, Robert (2007). Medieval Weapons: An Illustrated History of Their Impact. ABC-CLIO. ISBN 978-1-85109-526-1.
- Nicolle, David (2003). Byzantium, the Islamic World and India AD 476–1526. Medieval Siege Weapons. Vol. 2. Osprey Publishing. ISBN 978-1-84176-459-7.
- Brinton, Crane; John B. Cristopher; Robert Lee Wolff (1967). A History of Civilization -Vol I. New Jersey: Prentice Hall.
- Burns, Edward Mcnall (2025). Western Civilizations. New York: W W Norton & Company. ISBN 978-0-393-97221-4.
- Herbst, Judith (2005). The History of Weapons (Major inventions through History). Twenty-First Century Books. p. 56. ISBN 978-0-8225-3805-9.

== External sources ==
- A Brief History of Weapons
- Ancient Bronze Weapons
- Kedipede; Bow and Arrow
