= Ron Robin =

Israeli scholar (born 1951)

- רון רובין
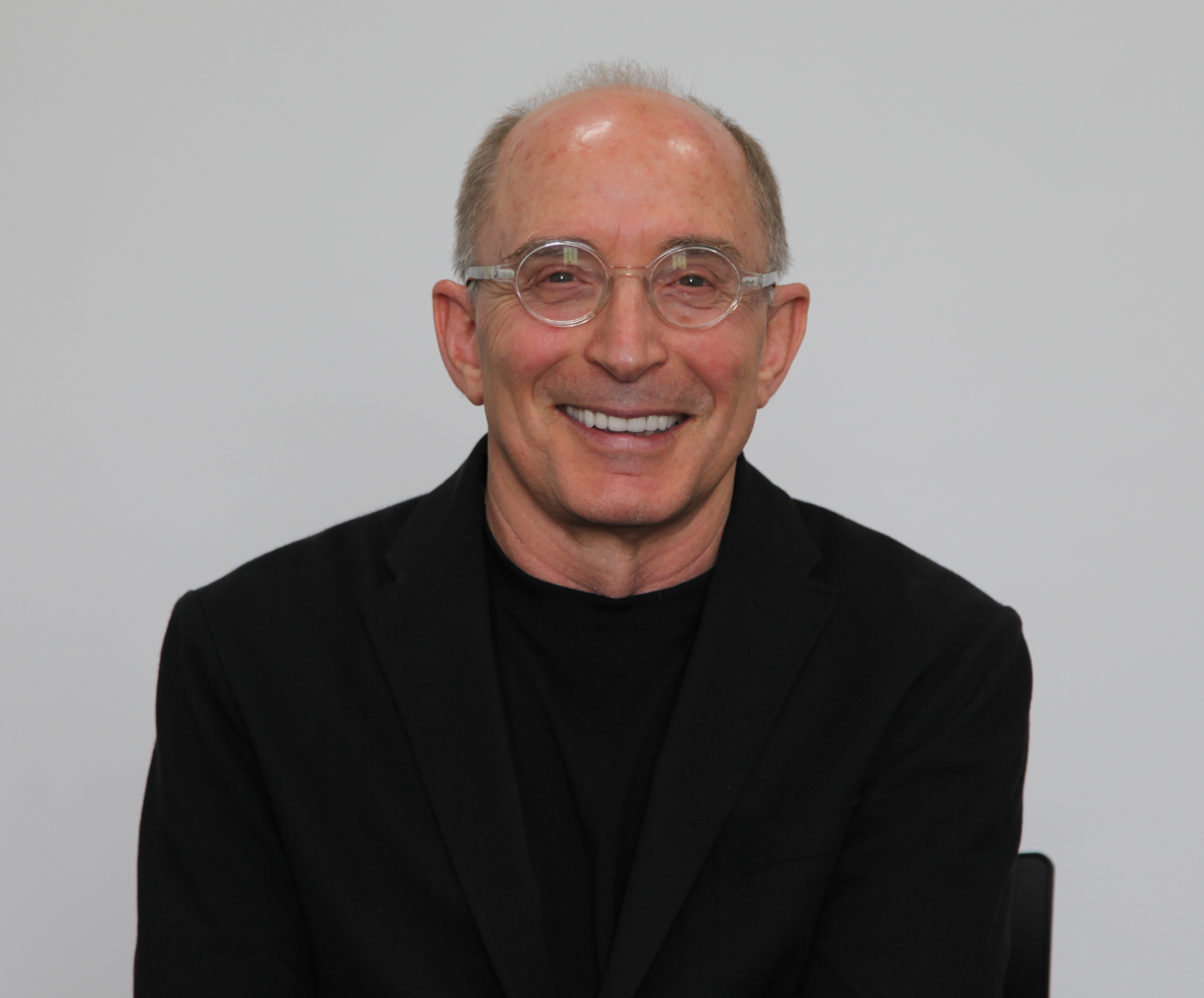
- Ron Robin
- Born: Ron Theodore Robin; April 23, 1951 (age 75); Tel Aviv, Israel
- Education: Hebrew University of Jerusalem (BA in romance languages and general history, 1978); University of California, Berkeley (PhD in modern US history, 1986)
- Known for: 11th President of the University of Haifa

Ron Theodore Robin (Hebrew: רון רובין; born April 23, 1951) is an Israeli scholar whose research focuses on the interface between culture and foreign policy in the United States. He was a senior faculty member at the University of Haifa, as well as a professor emeritus at New York University (NYU). Professor Ron Robin is currently Senior Advisor to the Leadership, New York University, Shanghai. Prior to this appointment, Robin served as the 11th president of the University of Haifa.

== Career ==
Robin was born in 1951 in Tel Aviv to Shani (Rozin), a Jerusalem-born scion of the Shaltiel family, and to Eli, a South African citizen who served as a volunteer in the 1948 Arab–Israeli War. Robin grew up in South Africa and returned with his family to Israel when he was 13 years old. He joined the Israeli Defense Force (IDF) in 1969. He served in the intelligence community, and was discharged with the rank of major.

In 1978, he was awarded a BA in romance languages and general history from the Hebrew University of Jerusalem. In 1986 he was granted a PhD in modern US history from the University of California, Berkeley. His thesis was entitled: "Signs of Change: urban iconographies in San Francisco, 1880-1915". In 1986, Robin returned to Israel and was admitted as a faculty member at the University of Haifa. Robin served as professor in the Department of Communications and the Department of General History and in 2000 was appointed dean of students, a position he held for five years.

In 2006, Robin moved to New York University, where he was appointed a professor in the Department of Media, Culture and Communications, and in 2007 was appointed associate dean at the NYU Steinhardt School.

In 2008, Robin was appointed senior vice provost, New York University, and was responsible for the establishment of the two NYU international campuses in Abu Dhabi and Shanghai. Robin's main role was to recruit faculty members for the new campuses.

In 2016 Robin was elected as the 11th president of the University of Haifa, and in October 2016 he assumed this role. Upon taking office, Robin conceived the program of transforming the University of Haifa into a Multiversity - a university with multiple campuses and research portals. In accordance with the program, the central campus on Mount Carmel was complemented by other portals, specializing in strategic research and multidisciplinary cooperation. Robin bolstered the central campus on Mount Carmel with two additional portals: the Lorey I. Lokey Technological Campus, located in the Port of Haifa district and specializing in computer science and data science. Robin created an additional portal through the acquisition of the Neri Blumfield Wizo College of Design, located in Haifa’s German colony, and its transformation into the University of Haifa new School of Design and Architecture. Robin’s final contribution to the development of the University was the establishment of a new medical school, recently approved by the Council of Higher Education. Robin funded this transformative project with the support of the largest donation ever raised in the University of Haifa’s history.

== Academic expertise ==
In contrast to the mainstream of modern American historians, who separate cultural history from diplomatic history, Robin's work combines the two currents, claiming that it is impossible to understand the foreign relations of the United States without understanding domestic cultural shifts. In his research, Robin describes US foreign policy in the 21st century as being "captive of the past", prisoners of an illusory perception, that the United States is under the same threats that cofounded the twentieth century. He describes the second Gulf War in 2003 as stemming from the perception of senior US officials that "another Pearl Harbor has to be avoided" - even though the cases of Iraq and Pearl Harbor are not at all similar.

In his latest book, The Cold World They Made, published by Harvard University Press, Robin claims that US foreign policy in the 21st century is a reproduction of the foreign policy of the 1950s and 1960s, when the nation labored under the threat of the Soviet atomic bomb. This policy, he argues, continued without distinction between presidents, parties, or political leanings and is still valid today.

== Personal life ==
Robin is married to Levia (Livi) Wolf, and the couple has four children.
