= Paul Forman (historian) =

American historian

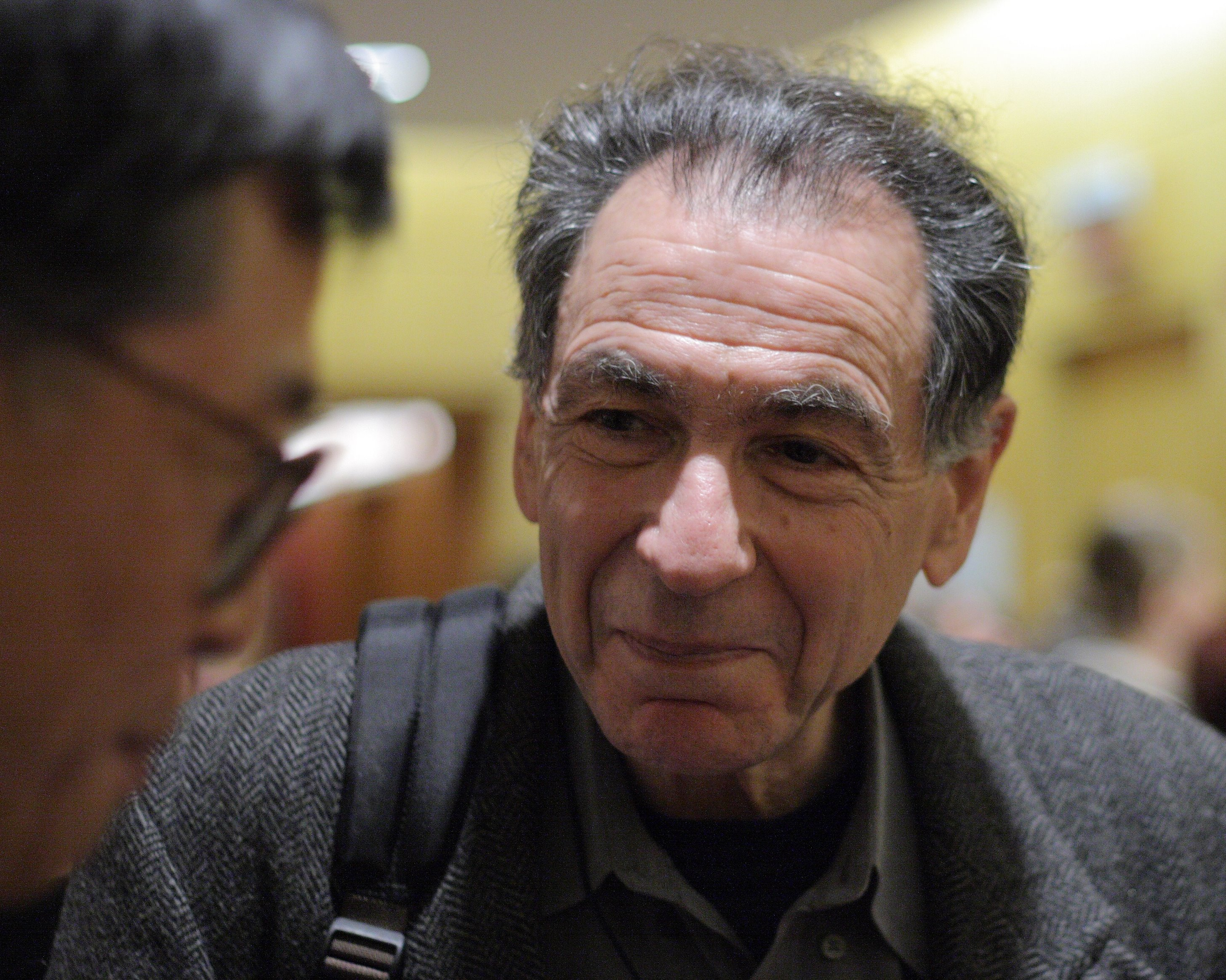
- Forman at the 2007 History of Science Society meeting
- Born: 1937 (age 88–89)
- Occupation: Historian of science

Paul Forman (born 1937) is a historian of science and is the retired curator of the Division of Medicine and Science at the National Museum of American History. Forman's primary research focus has been the history of physics, in which he has helped pioneer the application of cultural history to scientific developments.

Forman is especially known for two controversial historical theses. The first (often called "the Forman thesis") regards the influence of German culture on early interpretations of quantum mechanics; Forman argued that the culture of Weimar Germany, through its emphasis on acausality, individuality and visualizability (Anschaulichkeit), contributed to the acceptance and interpretation of quantum mechanics. Forman's second thesis regards the influence of military funding on the character and course of scientific research; he argued that during World War II and the Cold War, the massive scale of defense-related funding prompted a shift in physics from basic to applied research, spurring considerable historical research on the effects of the military funding of science. Forman's recent work focuses on "characterization of the modern/postmodern transition in science, society, and culture."

== Forman thesis ==
Forman (1971) argued the remarkable scientific achievements in quantum physics in Weimar Germany in the 1920s involved the cross-product of the hostile intellectual atmosphere whereby many scientists rejected Weimar Germany as an illegitimate state and in which there were intellectual revolts against causality, determinism and materialism. The scientists adjusted to the intellectual environment by dropping Newtonian causality from quantum mechanics, thereby opening up an entirely new and highly successful approach to physics. Forman links the emergence of quantum mechanics, and Bohr's Copenhagen interpretation in particular, to the postwar revolt against rationalist and causal-realist philosophies of science. Many intellectuals felt those philosophies somehow contributed to the crisis of European (more specifically German) national identity. Forman concludes that:

"If the physicist were to improve his public image he had first and foremost to dispense with causality, with rigorous determinism, that most universally abhorred feature of the physical world picture. And this, of course, turned out to be precisely what was required for the solution of those problems in atomic physics which were then at the focus of the physicist’s interest."

The "Forman Thesis" has generated an intense debate for and against among historians of science. In support of Forman, Max Jammer and others cite anti-rationalist movements such as existentialism, pragmatism, and logical empiricism as showing a post-war cultural climate that was receptive to the kinds of argument advanced by Bohr, Heisenberg, Dirac and others. Just as many scholars have challenged the Forman thesis.

He was elected a Fellow of the American Physical Society in 1988 "for his research on the history and cultural background of modern physics, and for his development of museum exhibits presenting physics to the public"
