= Spiritual but not religious =

Term used in religion

"Spiritual but not religious" (SBNR), also known as "spiritual but not affiliated" (SBNA), or sometimes "more spiritual than religious", is a popular phrase used to self-identify a life stance of spirituality that does not regard organized religion as the sole or most valuable means of furthering spiritual growth. Historically, the words religious and spiritual have been used synonymously to describe all the various aspects of the concept of religion, but in contemporary usage spirituality has often become associated with the interior life of the individual, placing an emphasis upon the well-being of the "mind-body-spirit", while religion refers to organizational or communal dimensions. Spirituality sometimes denotes non-institutionalized or individualized religiosity. The interactions are complex since even conservative Christians designate themselves as "spiritual but not religious" to indicate a form of non-ritualistic personal faith.

== Origins and demography ==
Historically, the words religious and spiritual have been used synonymously to describe all the various aspects of the concept of religion. However, religion is a highly contested term with scholars such as Russell McCutcheon arguing that the term "religion" is used as a way to name a "seemingly distinct domain of diverse items of human activity and production". The field of religious studies does not even agree on a single definition of religion, and because spirituality overlaps with it in many ways, there is also no consensus on the definition of spirituality. (Note: According to Linda Mercadante, the concept of religion is a social construct, since in other eras, religion, culture, and even national identity were often inseparable. And as for spirituality, this is an old concept with a new usage. Previous to today's era, what people today call spirituality was often called piety. Mercadante sees religion as a complex adaptive network of myths, symbols, rituals and concepts that simultaneously figure patterns of feeling, thinking, and acting and disrupt stable structures of meaning and purpose. When understood in that way, religion not only involves ideas and practices that are manifestly religious but also includes a broad range of cultural phenomena not ordinarily associated with religion. Many people use spirituality to refer to their interior life of faith and religion to mean the necessary communal and/or organizational part. Mercadante sees both spirituality and religion as consisting of four basic components: beliefs, desire, rituals, and behavioural expectations, but across the field of Religious Studies the definitions vary.)

The specific expression was used in several scholarly works, including an anthropological paper in 1960 and in Zinnbauer et al.'s seminal paper "Religiousness and Spirituality: Unfuzzying the Fuzzy". SBNR as a movement in America was delineated by author Sven Erlandson in his 2000 book Spiritual but not Religious. The phenomenon possibly started to emerge as a result of a new Romantic movement that began in the 1960s, whereas the relationship between the two has been remotely linked to William James' definition of religious experience, which he defines as the "feelings, acts and experiences of individual men in their solitude, so far as they apprehend themselves to stand in relation to whatever they may consider the divine". Romantic movements tend to lean away from traditional religion and resemble spiritual movements in their endorsement of mystical, unorthodox, and exotic ways. Owen Thomas also states that the ambiguity and lack of structure present in Romantic movements are also present within spiritual movements.

According to a study conducted by Pew Research Center in 2012, the number of Americans who do not identify with any religion has increased from 15% in 2007 to 20% in 2012, and this number continues to grow. 18% of the US public and a third of adults under the age of 30 are reportedly unaffiliated with any religion but identify as being spiritual in some way. Of these religiously unaffiliated Americans, 37% classify themselves as spiritual but not religious, while 68% say they do believe in God, and 58% feel a deep connection to the Earth. In 2017, Pew estimated that 27% of the population is spiritual but not religious, but they did not ask respondents directly on this designation. A 2023 study found that that figure was 22% when asking this directly.

Increased popular and scholarly attention to "spirituality" by scholars like Pargament has been related to sociocultural trends towards deinstitutionalization, individualization, and globalization.

Generational replacement has been understood as a significant factor of the growth of religiously unaffiliated individuals. Significant differences were found between the percentage of those considered younger Millennials (born 1990–1994) as compared with Generation Xers (born 1965–1980), with 34% and 21% reporting to be religiously unaffiliated, respectively.

Demographically, research has found that the religiously unaffiliated population is younger, predominately male, and 35% are between the ages of 18 and 29. Conversely, only 8% of religiously unaffiliated individuals are 65 and older. Among those unaffiliated with organized religion as a whole, 56% are men and 44% are women.

Another possible explanation for the emergence of SBNR is linguistic. Owen Thomas highlights the fact that spirituality movements tend to be localized to English and North American cultures. The meaning of the term "spirit" is more narrow in English than that of other languages, referring to all of the uniquely human capacities and cultural functions.

Yet, according to Siobhan Chandler, to appreciate the "god within" is not a twentieth century notion with its roots in 1960s counter culture or 1980s New Age, but spirituality is a concept that has pervaded all of history.

== Characteristics ==
=== Anti-institutional and personal ===
According to Abby Day, some of those who are critical of religion see it as rigid and pushy, leading them to use terms such as atheist or agnostic to describe themselves. For many people, SBNR is not just about rejecting religion outright, but not wanting to be restricted by it.

According to Linda Mercadante, SBNRs take a decidedly anti-dogmatic stance against religious belief in general. They claim not only that belief is non-essential, but that it is potentially harmful or at least a hindrance to spirituality.

According to Philip D. Kenneson, many of those studied who identify as SBNR feel a tension between their personal spirituality and membership in a conventional religious organization. Most of them value curiosity, intellectual freedom, and an experimental approach to religion. Many go as far to view organized religion as the major enemy of authentic spirituality, claiming that spirituality is private reflection and private experience—not public ritual. To be "religious" conveys an institutional connotation, usually associated with Abrahamic traditions: to attend worship services, to say Mass, to light Hanukkah candles. To be "spiritual", in contrast, connotes personal practice and personal empowerment having to do with the deepest motivations of life. As a result, in cultures that are deeply suspicious of institutional structures and that place a high value on individual freedom and autonomy, spirituality has come to have largely positive connotations, while religion has been viewed more negatively.

According to Robert Fuller, the SBNR phenomenon can be characterized as a mix of intellectual progressivism and mystical hunger, impatient with the piety of established churches.

According to Robert Wuthnow, spirituality is about much more than going to church and agreeing or disagreeing with church doctrines. Spirituality is the shorthand term used in Western society to talk about a person's relationship with God. For many people, how they think about religion and spirituality is certainly guided by what they see and do in their congregations. At a deeper level, it involves a person's self-identity—feeling loved by God, and these feelings can wax and wane.

=== Categorization ===
Linda A. Mercadante categorizes SBNRs into five distinct categories:

1. "Dissenters" are the people who, for the most part, make a conscious effort to veer away from institutional religion. "Protesting dissenters" refers to those SBNRs who have been 'turned off' by religious affiliation because of adverse personal experiences with it. "Drifted Dissenters" refers to those SBNRs who, for a multitude of reasons, fell out of touch with organized religion and chose never to go back. "Conscientious objector dissenters" refers to those SBNRs who are overtly skeptical of religious institutions and are of the view that religion is neither a useful nor necessary part of an individual's spirituality.
2. "Casuals" are the people who see religious and/or spiritual practices as primarily functional. Spirituality is not an organizing principle in their lives. Rather they believe it should be used on an as-needed basis for bettering their health, relieving stress, and for emotional support. The spirituality of "Casuals" is thus best understood as a "therapeutic" spirituality that centers on the individual's personal wellbeing.
3. "Explorers" are the people who seem to have what Mercadante refers to as a "spiritual wanderlust". These SBNRs find their constant search for novel spiritual practices to be a byproduct of their "unsatisfied curiosity", their desire for journey and change, as well as feelings of disappointment. Explorers are best understood as "spiritual tourists" who take comfort in the destination-less journey of their spirituality and have no intentions of ultimately committing to a spiritual home.
4. "Seekers" are those people who are looking for a spiritual home but contemplate recovering earlier religious identities. These SBNRs embrace the "spiritual but not religious" label and are eager to find a completely new religious identity or alternative spiritual group that they can ultimately commit to.
5. "Immigrants" are those people who have found themselves in a novel spiritual realm and are trying to adjust themselves to this newfound identity and its community. "Immigrants" can be best understood as those SBNRs who are "trying on" a radically new spiritual environment but have yet to feel completely settled there. For these SBNRs, although they are hoping to become fully integrated in their newfound spiritual identities, the process of acclimation is difficult and often disconcerting.

However, Mercadante's work is limited by her training as a theologian. In her view, SBNRs are not indifferent to theology. She assumes that any viable tradition requires a theological core, so SBNR is inherently nonviable because those beliefs lack a group-based theological core. Consequently, her categories ignore SBNRs who are not casual believers and who are not transitional to or from organized religion.

=== Practices ===
SBNR is related to feminist spiritual and religious thought and ecological spiritualities, and also to Neo-Paganism, Wicca, Shamanic, Druidic, Gaian and ceremonial magic practices. Some New Age spiritual practices include astrology, Ouija boards, Tarot cards, the I Ching, and science fiction. A common practice of SBNRs is meditation, such as mindfulness and Transcendental Meditation.

== Criticism ==
Some representatives of organized religion have criticized the practice of spirituality without religiosity. Lillian Daniel, a liberal Protestant minister, has characterized the SBNR worldview as a product of secular American consumer culture, far removed from community and "right smack in the bland majority of people who find ancient religions dull but find themselves uniquely fascinating". James Martin, a Jesuit priest, has called the SBNR lifestyle "plain old laziness", stating that "spirituality without religion can become a self-centered complacency divorced from the wisdom of a community".

Other critics contend that within the "Spiritual but not Religious" worldview, self-knowledge and self-growth have been problematically equated with knowledge of God, directing a person's focus inward. As a result, the political, economic, and social forces that shape the world are neglected and left untended. Further, some scholars have noted the relative spiritual superficiality of particular SBNR practices. Classical mysticism within the world's major religions requires sustained dedication, often in the form of prolonged asceticism, extended devotion to prayer, and the cultivation of humility. In contrast, SBNRs in the Western world are encouraged to dabble in spiritual practices in a way that is often casual and lacking in rigor or any reorganization of priorities. Sociologist Robert Wuthnow suggests that these forms of mysticism are "shallow and inauthentic". Other critics take issue with the intellectual legitimacy of SBNR scholarship. When contrasted with professional or academic theology, spiritual philosophies can appear unpolished, disjointed, or inconsistently sourced.

Wong and Vinsky challenge SBNR discourse that posits religion as "institutional and structured" in contrast to spirituality as "inclusive and universal" (1346). They argue that this understanding makes invisible the historical construction of "spirituality", which currently relies on a rejection of EuroChristianity for its own self-definition. According to them, Western discourses of "spirituality" appropriate indigenous spiritual traditions and "ethnic" traditions of the East, yet racialized ethnic groups are more likely to be labeled "religious" than "spiritual" by white SBNR practitioners. Wong and Vinsky assert that through these processes, colonial othering is enacted through SBNR discourse.

== See also ==
- Agnostic theism – Philosophical view combining theism with agnosticism
- Buddhist philosophy – Buddhist philosophical tradition
- Deism – Belief in a God who does not intervene in the universe
  - Moralistic therapeutic deism – American folk religion
  - Pandeism – Belief that God created the universe by becoming it
- Dharma – Key concept in Indian philosophy and Eastern religions, with multiple meanings
- Ecospirituality – Spirituality expressed through ecology and environmental activism
- Elite religion – Form of a religion the leaders deem official
- Ietsism – Unspecified belief in an undetermined transcendent reality
- Irreligion – Absence, indifference to, rejection of or hostility towards religion
- Lived religion – Religion as practiced in everyday life
- Natural religion – Concept in religious anthropology
- Nature worship – Worship of nature spirits
- Naturalistic pantheism – Form of pantheism
- New Thought – 19th-century American spiritual movement
- Non-denominational – Not restricted to any particular or specific religious denomination
- Non-overlapping magisteria – View of science and religion
- Non-theism – Absence of espoused belief in a God or gods
- Perennial philosophy – Idea that all religions share a single truth
- Philosophical theism – Belief that a deity exists or must exist
- Secular spirituality – Adherence to spirituality without religious adherence
- Sheilaism – Academic shorthand for an individualized, eclectic system of religious belief
- Spiritual naturalism – Combined philosophy of spirituality and naturalism
- Sufism – Mystic practices in Islam
