= Tourism with a Hand Lens =

"Ecotourism with a Hand Lens" is a term coined by Dr. Ricardo Rozzi and his colleagues to refer to a new speciality tourism being promoted in the Cape Horn Biosphere Reserve. Given the discovery of the archipelago's outstanding diversity of mosses, lichens and liverworts (5% of the world's total), Rozzi has called upon tourism operators to place this narrative into their offering for the region and take advantage of this biodiversity hotspot for non-vascular flora.

In turn, Rozzi and the Omora Ethnobotanical Park have metaphorically called these small plant communities the "Miniature Forests of Cape Horn" to help the broader society understand the ecological role played by these tiny, but diverse, abundant and important organisms. In the Magellanic Subantarctic ecoregion, the Cape Horn Biosphere Reserve and the Chilean Antarctic Peninsula, the number of foreign tourists has doubled in the last decade, with nature tourism being the principal attraction for visitors to the region. With the aim of preventing negative impacts of tourism activity on the biological and cultural diversity, and to contribute to sustainable tourism the Sub-Antarctic Biocultural Conservation Program at the Omora Ethnobotanical Park, in collaboration with local actors, has developed the field environmental philosophy methodological approach.

Field environmental philosophy methodology integrates ecological sciences and environmental ethics through a four-step cycle consisting of: (i) interdisciplinary ecological and philosophical research; (ii) composition of metaphors and communication of simple narratives; (iii) design of field activities guided with an ecological and an ethical orientation; and (iv) implementation of in situ conservation areas. Under the perspective of field environmental philosophy we have defined ecotourism as “an invitation to have a tour or trip to share and appreciate the oikos of the diverse human and nonhuman inhabitants, their habits and habitats.” This methodological approach is implemented with the activity of “ecotourism with a hand-lens” at Omora Park. "Ecotourism with a hand-lens” aims to demonstrate that when adequately planned and administered, ecotourism can contribute to biocultural conservation hand in hand with environmental, economic, and social sustainability.

"Tourism with a hand lens" has been likened to a nature-venerating ritual by the ethnographer Bron Taylor in his book Dark Green Religion.

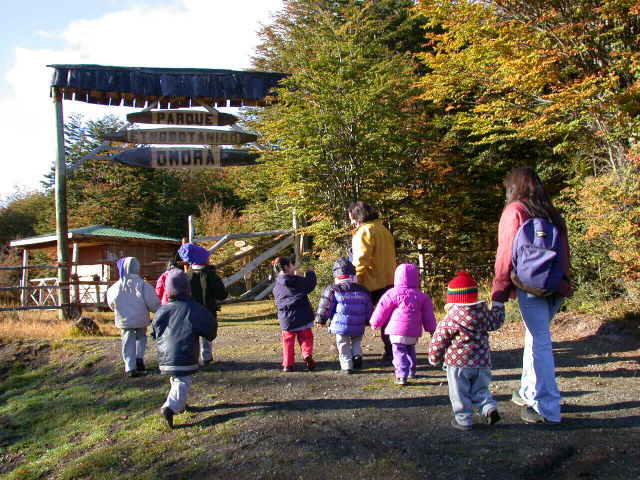
Children entering Omora Ethnobotanical Park
