= Ecospirituality =

Spirituality expressed through ecology and environmental activism

Ecospirituality connects the science of ecology with spirituality. It brings together religion and environmental activism. Ecospirituality has been defined as "a manifestation of the spiritual connection between human beings and the environment." The new millennium and the modern ecological crisis has created a need for environmentally based religion and spirituality. Ecospirituality is understood by some practitioners and scholars as one result of people wanting to free themselves from a consumeristic and materialistic society. Ecospirituality has been critiqued for being an umbrella term for concepts such as deep ecology, ecofeminism, and nature religion.

Proponents may come from a range of faiths including: Islam; Jainism; Christianity (Catholicism, Evangelicalism and Orthodox Christianity); Judaism; Hinduism; Buddhism and Indigenous traditions. In Brazil, the contemporary spiritual and philosophical movement Harmoniismo emerged, connecting ecological concerns with spirituality and emphasizing the interconnectedness of human beings, other forms of life, nature, and spiritual development. lthough many of their practices and beliefs may differ, a central claim is that there is "a spiritual dimension to our present ecological crisis." According to the environmentalist Sister Virginia Jones, "Eco-spirituality is about helping people experience 'the holy' in the natural world and to recognize their relationship as human beings to all creation.

Ecospirituality has been influenced by the ideas of deep ecology, which is characterized by "recognition of the inherent value of all living beings and the use of this view in shaping environmental policies." Similarly to ecopsychology, it refers to the connections between the science of ecology and the study of psychology. 'Earth-based' spirituality is another term related to ecospirituality; it is associated with pagan religious traditions and the work of prominent ecofeminist, Starhawk. Ecospirituality refers to the intertwining of intuition and bodily awareness pertaining to a relational view between human beings and the planet.

== Origins ==
Ecospirituality finds its history in the relationship between spirituality and the environment. Some scholars say it "flows from an understanding of cosmology or the story of the origin of the universe." There are multiple origin stories about how the spiritual relationship with people and the environment began. In Native America philosophy, there are many unique stories of how spirituality came to be. A common theme in a number of them is the discussion of a Great Spirit that lives within the universe and the earth represents its presence.

Ecospirituality has also sprung from a reaction to the Western world's materialism and consumerism, characterized by ecotheologian Thomas Berry as a "crisis of cosmology." Scholars have argued that "the modern perspective is based on science and focused on the human self with everything else being outside, resulting in the demise of the metaphysical world and the disenchantment with the cosmos." Therefore, ecospirituality originates as a rebuttal to the emphasis on the material as well as Western separation from the environment, where the environment is regarded as a set of material resources with primarily instrumental value.

== Ecological crisis ==
Ecospirituality became popularized due to a need for a reconceptualization of the human relationship with the environment. Terms such as environmental crisis, ecological crisis, climate change, global warming all refer to an ongoing global issue that needs to be addressed. Generally the ecological crisis is referring to the destruction of the earth's ecosystem. What this encompasses is a highly controversial debate in scientific and political spheres. Globally we are faced with pollution of our basic needs (air, and water) as well as the depletion of important resources, most notably food resources.

Annette Van Schalkwyk refers to the environmental crisis as “man-made”. It is arguably the result of a “mechanistic and capitalistic world view”. Whether it is man-made, or as some argue, a natural occurrence, humans are not helping. Pollution and depletion of resources play a major role in the ecological crisis. Bringing religion into the ecological crisis is controversial due to the divide between religion and science. Ecospirituality is prepared to acknowledge science, and work in tandem with religion to frame the environment as a sacred entity in need of protection.

Mary Evelyn Tucker notes the importance of religion and ecology connecting with sustainability. Due to the environmental crisis, perceptions of sustainability are changing. Religion and ecology, and the way people experience ecospirituality, could contribute to this changing definition of sustainability.

== Research on ecospirituality ==
Ecospirituality has been studied by academics in order to understand a clearer definition of what individuals label as ecospirituality and the framework in which they create this definition. One study focused on holistic nurses, who themselves characterize their profession as having a fundamentally spiritual nature and a sense of the importance of the environment. Researchers performed a phenomenological study where they assessed the nurses' ecospiritual consciousness. For the purpose of their study, they defined ecospiritual consciousness as "accessing a deep awareness of one's ecospiritual relationship." They then narrowed down their findings to the five principles of ecospiritual consciousness, which are: tending, dwelling, reverence, connectedness, and sentience.

1. Tending was defined as "being awake and conscious," with "deep, inner self-reflection."
2. Dwelling was defined as "a process of being with the seen and the unseen."
3. Reverence was defined as "rediscovering the mystery present present in all creation and is embodied sense of the sacred," focusing on the earth.
4. Connectedness was defined as an "organic relationship with the universe."
5. Sentience was defined as "a sense of knowing."

Another study looked at medical effects of ecospirituality by having patients with cardiovascular disease practice "environmental meditation" and log regular journal entries about their experiences. Researchers started out with the research question of, "What is the essence of the experience of ecospirituality meditation in patients with CVD?" CVD is an acronym for cardiovascular disease. From analyzing journal entries of participants, researchers abstracted four major themes of ecospirituality meditation: entering a new time zone, environmental reawakening, finding a new rhythm, and the creation of a healing environment.

1. Entering a new time zone was described by researchers as "the expansion of time during meditation."
2. Environmental Reawakening was described by researchers as "opened participants’ eyes to vistas not previously noticed"
3. Finding a new rhythm was described by the researchers as "enhanced relationships with their family, friends, coworkers, and even their pets."
4. The creation of a healing environment was described by the researchers as "With raised consciousnesses, they became aware of the choices they had regarding what types of intentions and energy that wanted to put out in their environment."

This research was driven by the goal of raising awareness among healthcare professionals about ecospirituality and the medical importance of both self and environmental consciousness. Anecdotal evidence showed a decrease in blood pressure. However, the psychological benefits of environmental meditation were the main focus for the researchers.

== Dark Green Religion ==
Dark Green Religion is one way in which people, both secular and religious, connect with nature on a spiritual level. Bron Taylor defines Dark Green Religion as "religion that considers nature to be sacred, imbued by intrinsic value, and worthy of reverent care" in his book Dark Green Religion: Nature Spirituality and the Planetary Future. Nature religion is an overarching term of which Dark Green Religion is a part of. A key part of Dark Green Religion is the "depth of its consideration of nature."

Dark Green Religion differs from Green Religion. Green Religion claims that it is a religious obligation for humans to be environmental stewards, while Dark Green Religion is a movement that simply holds nature as valuable and sacred. Spiritual types of Dark Green Religion include Naturalistic and Supernaturalistic forms of Animism and of Gaianism. The diverse views within Dark Green Religion are not without the idea that the earth is sacred and worthy of care. The perceptions of Dark Green Religion are global and flexible. Taylor's use of the word 'Dark' gestures toward these negative possibilities. According to Taylor, Dark Green Religion has the possibility to "inspire the emergence of a global, civic, earth religion." Dark Green, Green and Nature Religions are arguably all a part of ecospirituality. The term ecospirituality is versatile and overarching.

== Ecofeminism and spirituality ==
The umbrella term "ecospirituality" covers the feminist theology called ecofeminism. The term ecofeminism was first coined by the French writer Françoise D'Eaubonne in her book, Le Féminisme ou la Mort in order to name the connection between the patriarchal subjugation of women and the destruction of nature. In it, she argues that women have different ways of seeing and relating to the world than men. These differences can give rise alternative insights on interactions between humans and the natural world when women's perspectives are considered. The suppression and control of woman and the natural world are connected.

On the ecofeminist view, women are controlled because they are thought to be closer to primitive nature. By understanding the connection between femininity and nature and by exploring feminine ways of seeing and relating, ecofeminism asserts that humans can realize positive ways of interacting with the natural world and with each other.

=== Ecofeminism and Christianity on the ecological crisis ===
A significant figure in Christian ecofeminism is Rosemary Radford Ruether. Ruether argues that feminism and ecology share a common vision, even though they use different languages. In her work, Gaia and God: An Ecofeminist Theology of Earth Healing Ruether provides three recommendations on ways to move forward with repairing and "healing" the ecological crisis.

The first recommendation is that "the ecological crisis needs to be seen not just as a crisis in the health of nonhuman ecosystems, polluted water, contaminated skies, threatened climate change, deforestation, extinction of species, important as all these realities are. Rather one needs to see the interconnections between the impoverishment of the earth and the impoverishment of human groups, even as others are enriching themselves to excess."

The second recommendation is that "a healed ecosystem – humans, animals, land, air, and water together – needs to be understood as requiring a new way of life, not just a few adjustments here and there." The third and final recommendation is that the need for a new vision is necessary: "one needs to nurture the emergence of a new planetary vision and communal ethic that can knit together people across religions and cultures. There is rightly much dismay at the role that religions are playing in right-wing politics and even internecine violence today. But we need also to recognize the emergence of new configurations of inter-religious relations."

=== Ecofeminism and Christianity in liberation theology ===
According to Ivone Gebara, in Latin America, particularly in Christian Churches in Brazil, it is difficult to be a feminist, but more difficult to be an ecofeminist. Gebara explains ecology as one of the "deepest concerns of feminism and ecology as having a deep resonance or a political and anthropolocial consequence from a feminist perspective." Gebara believes that it is the task of different groups of Latin American women to "provide a new order of meaning including marginalized people." This task is both challenging and political. Gebara says: "We can choose the life of the planet and the respect of all living beings or we choose to die by our own bad decisions."

== World religions and ecospirituality ==
=== Ecospirituality and paganism ===
Paganism is a nature-based religion that exists in a multitude of forms. There is no official doctrine or sacred text that structures its practice. Due to its lack of structure, many Pagans believe that it should be used as a tool to combat the current ecological crisis because it is flexible and can adapt to the environment's needs. Ecospirituality advocates contend that an ecology-based religion that focuses on the nurturing and healing of the earth is necessary in modernity. As paganism is already based in nature worship, many believe it would be a useful starting point for ecospirituality. In fact, neopagan revivals have seen the emergence of pagan communities that are more earth-focused. They may build their rituals around advocacy for a sustainable lifestyle and emphasize complete interconnectedness with the earth. Paganism understands divine figures to exist not as transcendent beings, but as immanent beings in the present realm, meaning that their divine figures exist within each of us, and within nature. Many pagans believe in interconnectedness among all living beings, which allows them to foster moments of self-reflection before acting. These pagan ideals coincide with ecospirituality because pagans understand the environment to be part of the divine realm and part of their inner self. Therefore, in their view, harming the environment directly affects their wellbeing. Pagans have already recognized the importance of incorporating environmental ideologies with their own religious beliefs. The Dragon Environmental Network is a pagan community based in the UK. They are committed to practicing "eco-magic" with the intention of recognizing the earth as sacred and divine. Their four goals are as follows:

1. Increase general awareness of the sacredness of the Earth.
2. Encourage pagans to become involved in conservation work.
3. Encourage pagans to become involved in environmental campaigns.
4. Develop the principles and practice of magical and spiritual action for the environment.

Paganism combines religion with environmental activism. Pagans organize protests, campaigns, and petitions with the environment in mind while staying true to their religious beliefs. Bron Taylor, argues that their core Pagan beliefs greatly improves their environmental activism. Additionally, the Pagan community has recently released a statement on the ecological crisis. It explains that Pagans lead lives that foster “harmony with the rhythms of our great Earth" and that they view the Earth as their equal in stating “we are neither above nor separate from the rest of nature”. It states that we are part of a web of life, and are fully interconnected with the biosphere. This connection to all living beings is seen as spiritual and sacred. And in turn it provides a framework that Pagans can use to combine their religious beliefs with environmental activism. It calls for a return to ancient understandings of the earth by listening to ancient wisdom. It asks Pagans to practice their religion in all aspects of their lives in order to give the Earth room to heal. The statement concludes by stating “building a truly sustainable culture means transforming the systems of domination and exploitation that threaten our future into systems of symbiotic partnership that support our ecosystems”.

=== Ecospirituality and Christianity ===
Most Christian theology has centered on the doctrine of creation. According to Elizabeth Johnson, in recent years, this has led to growing ecological awareness among Christians. The logic of this stance is rooted in the theological idea that since God created the world freely, it has an intrinsic value and is worthy of our respect and care. In 1990, Pope John Paul II wrote a letter on ecological issues. He concluded the letter with a discussion of Christian belief and how it should lead to ethical care of the earth. He ended the letter with the principle "respect for life and the dignity of human person must extend also to the rest of creation."

The doctrines of Christ that Christians follow also have the potential for ecological spirituality for they support interpretations that are consistent with ecospirituality. According to Elizabeth Johnson, Jesus' view of the Kingdom of God included earthly wellbeing. According to Thomas Berry, Christians recognize a need for an Earth Ethic. The Ecumenical Patriarch Bartholomew, leader of the Greek Orthodox Church, has organized major religion and science symposia on water issues across Europe, the Amazon River and Greenland. He has issued statements – including a joint statement with John Paul II in 2002 – calling destruction of the environment "ecological sin." Bishop Malone, president of the National Conference of Catholic Bishops has said: "The Church stands in need of a new symbolic and affective system through which to proclaim the Gospel to the modern world." In the ecotheology of the late Thomas Berry, he argues that Christians often fail to realize that both their social and religious wellbeing depend on the wellbeing of Earth. Earth provides sustenance for physical, imaginative and emotions, and religious wellbeing. In Thomas Berry's view, the Christian future will depend on the ability of Christians to assume their responsibility for Earth's fate. An example of such responsibility-taking can be seen in the founding of an association called "Sisters of Earth," which is made up of nuns and laywomen. This network of women from diverse religious communities is significant, both for the movement of general concern for the natural world and for the religious life in Christian contexts.

=== Ecospirituality and Hinduism ===
Many teachings in Hinduism are intertwined with the ethics of ecospirituality in their stress on environmental wellbeing. The Hindu text called the Taittariya Upanishad refers to creation as offspring of the Supreme Power, paramatman. Thus, the environment is related to something that is divine and therefore deserves respect. Since the late 1980s, when the negative effects of mass industrialization were becoming popularized, India instituted administrative policies to deal with environmental conservation. These policies were rooted in the ways that the Hindu religion is tied to the land.

In the Hindu text Yajurveda (32.10), God is described as being present in all living things, further reinforcing the need to show respect for creation. Passages such as this lead some Hindus to become vegetarian and to affirm a broader type of ecospiritual connection to the Earth. Vishnu Purana 3.8.15. states that, "God, Kesava, is pleased with a person who does not harm or destroy other non-speaking creatures or animals." This notion is tied in with the Hindu concept of karma. Karma means that the pain caused to other living things will come back to you through the process of reincarnation.

Ecospirituality can also be seen in the Prithivi Sukta which is a "Hymn to Mother Earth." In this text, the Earth is humanized into a spiritual being to which humans have familial ties. Through ecospirituality, the notion of praising and viewing the Earth in this way brings about its strong connections to Hinduism.

=== Ecospirituality and Jainism ===
Contemporary Jaina faith is "inherently ecofriendly". In terms of the ecological crisis, Jains are “quite self-conscious of the ecological implications of their core teachings.”

Jain teachings center on five vows that lead to reversing the flow of or release karma. One of these vows is ahimsa or non-violence. Ahimsa “is said to contain the key to advancement along the spiritual path (sreni). This requires abstaining from harm to any being that possesses more than one sense” The principles of the Jaina tradition are rooted in environmental practices. The Jaina connection to nature is conducive to ecospirituality.

=== Ecospirituality and Islam ===
Some scholars argue that while looking at the scriptural sources of Islam, you can see it is an ecologically orientated religion. Looking at textual sources of Islam, the shari'a preach a number of environmentally focused guidelines to push environmentalism, in particular, "maintenance of preserves, distribution of water, and the development of virgin lands." Much of Muslim environmentalism is a result of the Qur'anic stress of stewardship which is explained through the Arabic concept khilafa. A quote translated from the hadith states, "Verily, this world is sweet and appealing, and Allah placed you as vice-regents therein! He will see what you do." Within the Islamic faith, there is a set importance to following the messages set forth in scripture, therefore the environmentalism spoken through them has led to a spirituality around the environment. This spirituality can also be seen with Qur'anic concept of tawhid, which translates to unity. Many Muslim environmentalists see this meaning spiritually as "all-inclusive" when in relation to the Earth.

A majority of Muslim writers draw attention to the environmental crisis as a direct result of social injustice. Many argue that the problem is not that, "humans as a species are destroying the balance of nation, but rather that some humans are taking more than their share." Muslim environmentalists such as Fazlun Khalid, Yasin Dutton, Omar Vadillo, and Hashim Dockrat have drawn a correlation between the capitalist nature of the global economy to being un-Islamic and essentiality leading to ecological crisis.

The issues of environmental degradation are especially important to Muslims as majority of Muslims live in developing countries where they see the effects of the ecological crisis on a daily basis. This has led to conferences discussing Islam and the environment to take place in Iran and Saudi Arabia as well as the introduction of environmental nongovernmental organizations.

=== Ecospirituality and Buddhism ===
Buddhism was founded in ancient India between the 6th and 4th century BCE. However, with modern concerns on issues such as global warming, many Buddhist scholars have looked back at what Buddhist teaching has to say about the environmental crisis and developed what is called Green Buddhism. One of the key players in this introduction was Gary Snyder who brought to light where Buddhist practice and ecological thinking intertwine. Green Buddhism made waves in the 1980s when they publicly addressed the ecological crisis to create awareness and in 1989 when the Dalai Lama won a Nobel Peace Prize for the proposed introduction of Tibet as an ecological reserve.

Buddhism has been open to working with other world religions to combat the environmental crisis seen at an international conference for Buddhist-Christian studies that addressed the environment. Although Green Buddhism has not commented much on technical issues such as air and water pollution, they use their spirituality to focus heavily on "rich resources for immediate application in food ethics, animal rights, and consumerism."

== See also ==
- Religion and environmentalism – Interdisciplinary subfield
- Ecopsychology – Psychological relationship between humans and the natural world
- Spiritual ecology – Field in religion, conservation, and academia
- Environmental ethics – Part of environmental philosophy
- Indigenous American philosophy – Philosophies of the first inhabitants of the Americas
- Religious naturalism – Naturalism in religion
