= Ricardo Rozzi =

Chilean ecologist and philosopher (born 1960)

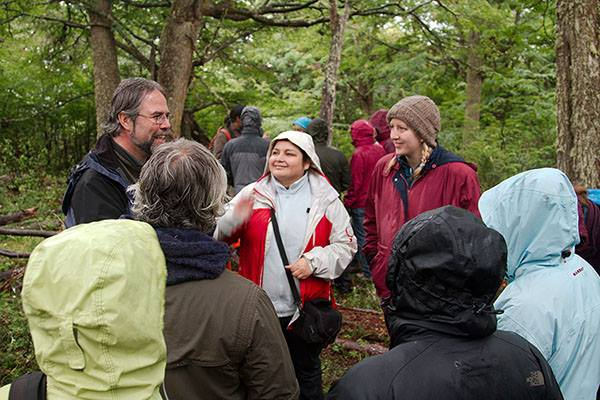
Ricardo Rozzi in a Field Environmental Philosophy workshop

Ricardo Rozzi (born October 6, 1960, in Santiago) is a Chilean ecologist and philosopher who is professor at the University of North Texas and the Universidad de Magallanes (UMAG). His research combines the two disciplines through the study of the interrelations between the ways of knowing and inhabiting the natural world, proposing a dynamic continuous reciprocal feedback between both domains.

== Conservation and applied environmental philosophy ==
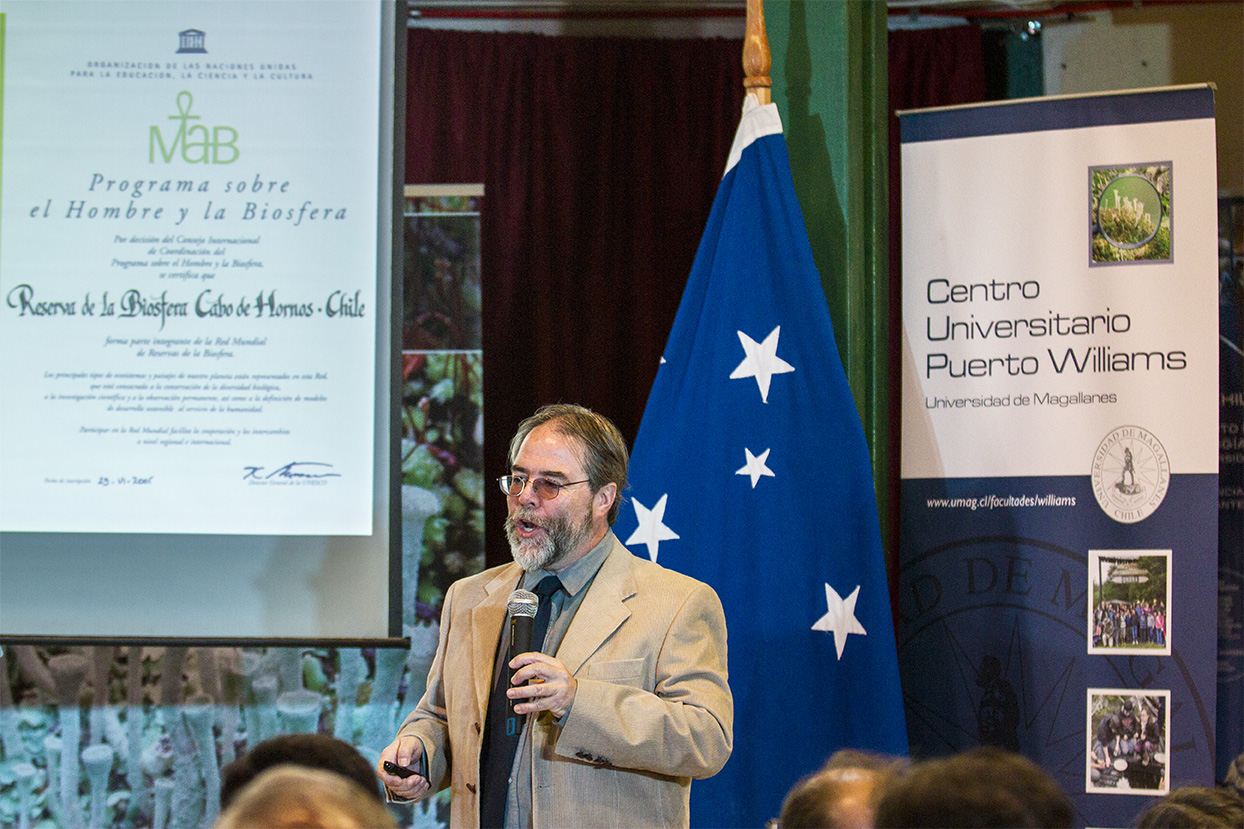
Ricardo Rozzi speaking at the 2014 International Association of Bryologists about his role in creating the UNESCO Cape Horn Biosophere Reserve, a hotspot for bryophyte diversity and conservation

In addition to his theoretical work, Rozzi has collaborated with the Chilean Ministry of Education, the Latin American Ecology Schoolyard Program, and has participated in the creation of the "Senda Darwin" Biological Station (Chiloé Island, Chile), the Latin American Network of Ethnobotanical Parks, the Omora Ethnobotanical Park (Puerto Williams, Chile), and the UNESCO Cape Horn Biosphere Reserve at the southern end of the Americas, with the aim of incorporating environmental ethics in the practices of conservation and education in Latin America. Currently, he is the director of the Subantarctic Biocultural Conservation Program, coordinated by the University of North Texas in the US, and by the Universidad de Magallanes and the Institute of Ecology and Biodiversity in Chile. With these institutions, he co-directs a biocultural conservation and "field environmental philosophy" program working in collaboration with the Center for Environmental Philosophy.

== Biocultural conservation ==
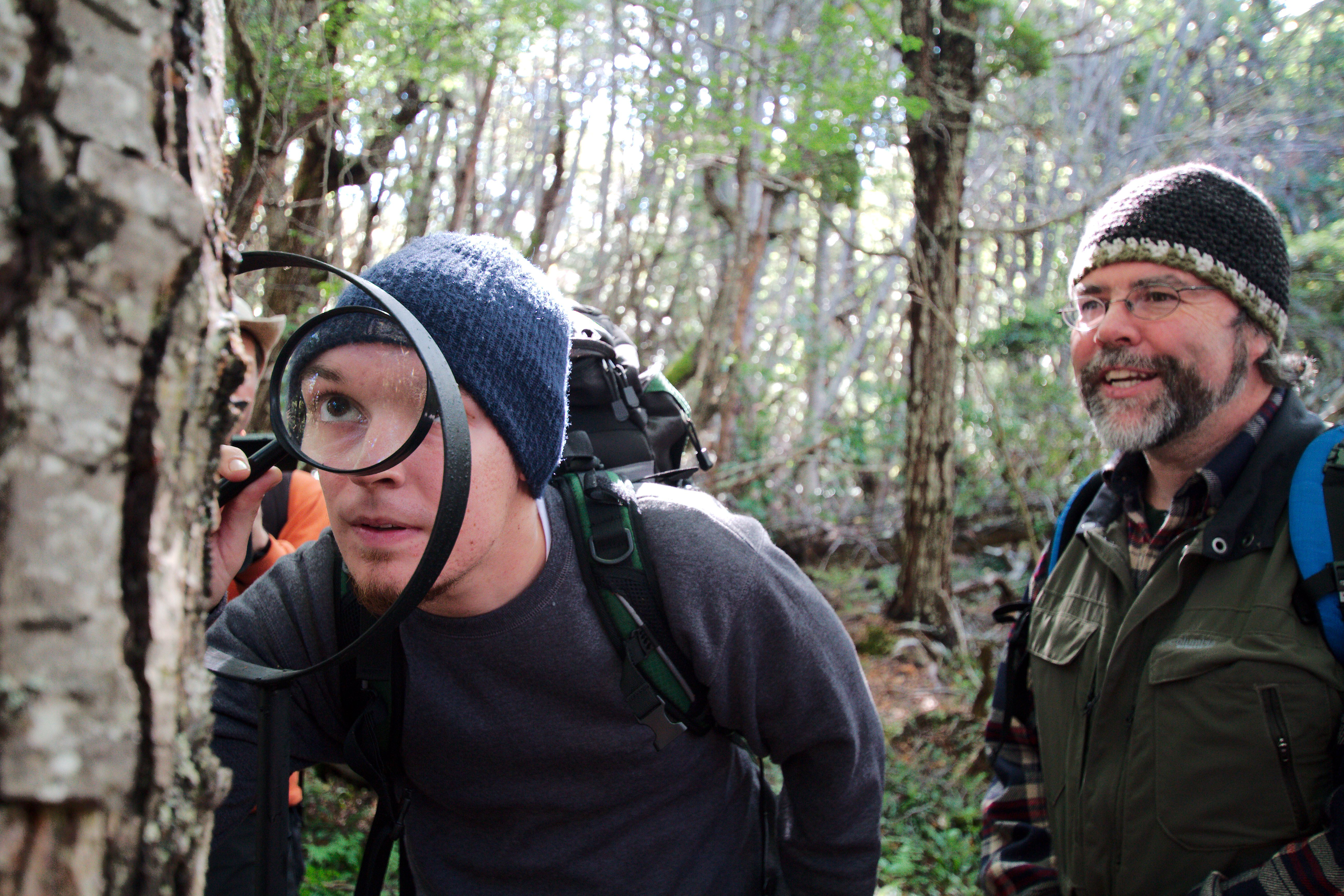
Tourism with a Hand Lens

As the co-founder of the Omora Ethnobotanical Park and the leader in the creation of the Cape Horn Biosphere Reserve, his academic work has been strongly associated with application and includes a novel focus on "biocultural conservation" and the "linking of human well-being with the environment." Within this same line of inquiry, Rozzi coined the terms "biocultural ethics" and "field environmental philosophy" to denote his emphasis on applying philosophy to real life situations using direct encounter experiences to enrich both academic formation as well as inform social processes, such as decision-making and ecotourism. For example, based on the discovery of the outstanding diversity of mosses, lichens and liverworts (5% of the world's total) in the Magellanic sub-Antarctic ecoregion, Dr. Ricardo Rozzi and his colleagues has coined the term "Tourism with a Hand Lens" to refer to a new speciality tourism being promoted in the Cape Horn Biosphere Reserve. Rozzi has called upon tourism operators to place this narrative into their offering for the region and take advantage of this biodiversity hotspot for non-vascular flora. In turn, Rozzi and the Omora Ethnobotanical Park have metaphorically called these small plant communities the "Miniature Forests of Cape Horn" to help the broader society understand the ecological role played by these tiny, but diverse, abundant and important organisms.

== Honors and awards ==
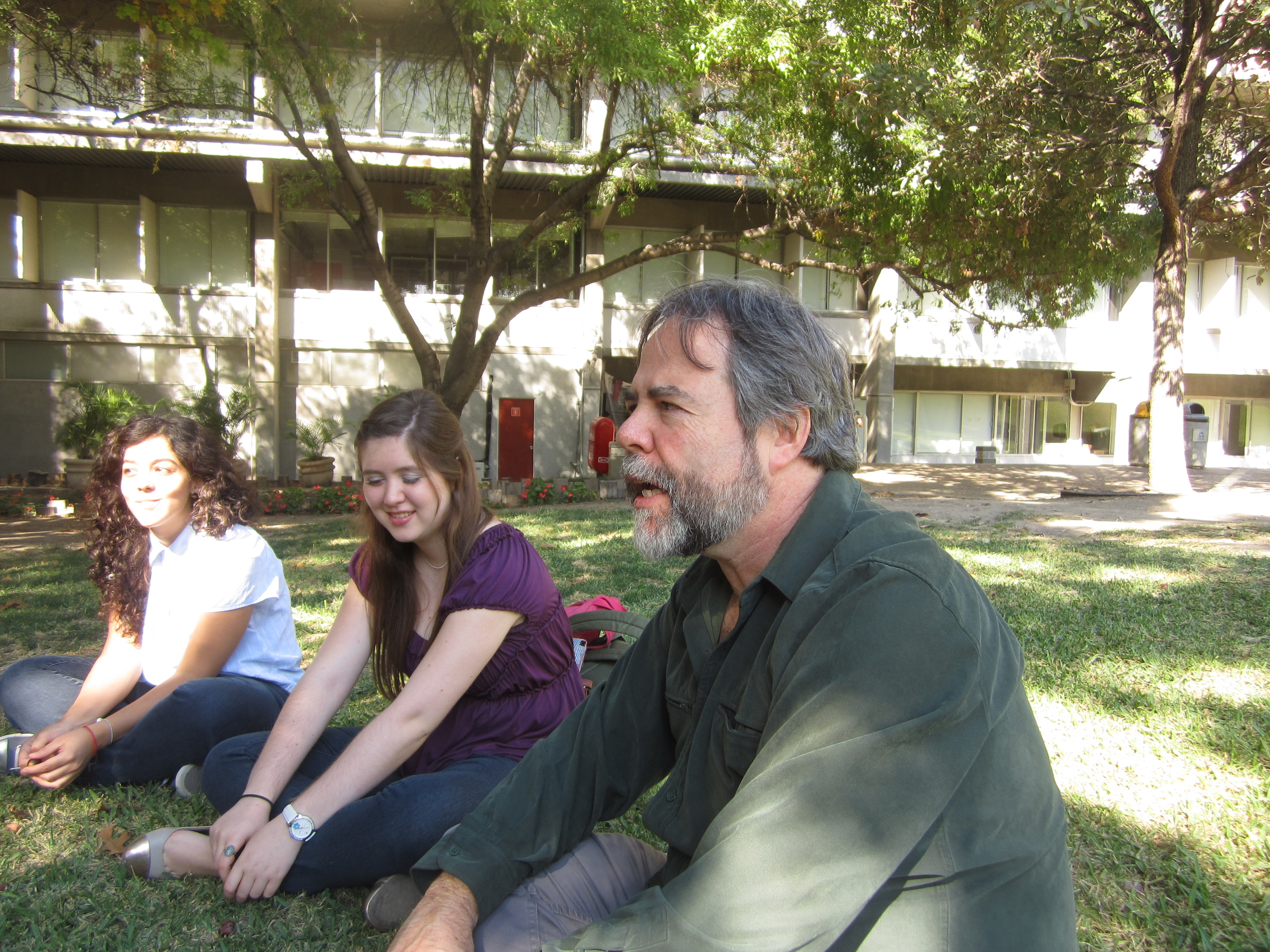
Environmental Ethics workshop in Monterrey University

In a recent review of the impact of Aldo Leopold's The Land Ethic, his son Carl Leopold termed Rozzi's work "ecological ethics", placing it on its own branch in the "tree-like" genealogy he conceived as the legacy of his father's seminal conservation and environmental philosophy work.

As a prolific writer, Rozzi's academic productivity includes dozens of articles, translations, chapters, and books on multiple topics that range from ethnoornithology to environmental education and philosophy to conservation. Perhaps his most important influential work is the only Latin American textbook on conservation biology called Fundamentos de Conservación Biológica: Perspectivas Latinoamericanas.

For his achievements in academia and his broader impact in society, Rozzi has received numerous regional, national and international honors, including:

- 2023 Award for Management of Protected Areas, category “Science for Protected Areas”, Chilean Ministry of the Environment; National Forestry Corporation, CONAF, and Protected Areas Foundation (Premio “Reconocimiento a la Gestión de Áreas Protegidas”, categoría “Ciencia para áreas Protegidas”, Ministerio de Medio Ambiente; Corporación Nacional Forestal, CONAF, y Fundación Áreas Protegidas), Santiago, Chile.
- 2022 Premio Luis Oyarzún, for outstanding contribution to the arts, sciences, and humanities, Universidad Austral de Chile, Valdivia, Chile.
- 2021 Fellow Rachel Carson Center for Environment and Society, Ludwig-Maximilians-Universität, München, Germany.
- 2020 Strait of Magellan Award for Innovation and Exploration with Global Impact, in the Magallanes Category, for "Ecotourism with and Hand Lens" and Cape Horn Natural Laboratory initiatives, given by the Imagine Chile Foundation.
- 2019 Eugene P. Odum Award for Excellence in Ecology Education, given by the Ecological Society of America, United States.
- 2014 College of Arts and Sciences Award for Research Excellence given by the University of North Texas, United States.
- 2010 Raanan Weitz Projects' Competition 2010, given by the Weitz Center for Developmental Studies, Rehovot, Israel.
- 2009 "Citation for Distinguished Service to International Education" given by the University of North Texas, United States.
- 2008 "Premio Convivencia Sustentable (Sustainable Living Award)" given by the Fundación Casa de la Paz, Santiago, Chile (Peace House Foundation)
- 2008 Science and Practice of Ecology and Society Award, given by the Resilience Alliance
- 2006 "Gold Medal" and Illustrious Citizen of the City of Padua, Italy.
- 2004 BBVA Foundation Prize for Research in Conservation (in association with other scientists at the Institute of Ecology and Biodiversity), Spain.
- 2004 Chilean National Award for Scientific Communication (CONICYT-Explora)
- 1996–1998 U.S. Fulbright Scholar

In 2010, Rozzi's conservation work was also featured in a book by religion and nature scholar Bron Taylor exploring, among other things, the fusion of conservation science with nature spirituality, an integration that is illustrated in his written and audiovisual works.

== See also ==
- Ethnoornithology
- List of environmental philosophers
- Spiritual ecology
