= Ivone =

Ivone is a given name. Notable people, both men and women, with the name include:

- Dona Ivone Lara (born 1921), Brazilian singer
- Ivone De Franceschi (born 1974), Italian footballer
- Ivone Gebara (born 1944), Brazilian feminist theologian
- Ivone Kirkpatrick (1897–1964), British diplomat
- Ivone Ramos (born 1926), Cape Verdean writer
