= List of environmental philosophers =

A list of environmental philosophers, ordered alphabetically, which includes living or recently deceased individuals who have published in the field of environmental ethics/philosophy (most of whom have PhDs in Philosophy, and are employed as philosophy professors), and those who are commonly regarded as precursors to the field.

Environmental philosophy has been impacted by individuals with a range of backgrounds, reminiscent of the approach of the natural philosophy, natural religion, and natural history traditions.

- David Abram
- Glenn Albrecht
- Robin Attfield
- Jane Bennett
- Thomas Berry
- Murray Bookchin
- J. Baird Callicott, University of North Texas
- Alan Carter, University of Glasgow
- Stephen R. L. Clark, University of Liverpool
- Kathleen Dean Moore
- Jan Deckers, Newcastle University
- Paul R. Ehrlich
- Warwick Fox
- Robert Frodeman, University of North Texas
- Brian Goodwin
- Ben Hale, University of Colorado Boulder
- Donna Haraway
- James Hatley, Salisbury University
- Serenella Iovino
- Dale Jamieson
- Erazim Kohák
- Gilbert LaFreniere
- Bruno Latour
- Aldo Leopold
- James Lovelock
- Alan Marshall
- Freya Mathews, La Trobe University
- Humberto Maturana
- Carolyn Merchant
- Mary Midgley
- Seyyed Hossein Nasr
- Arne Næss
- Michael P. Nelson, Michigan State University
- Max Oelschlaeger
- John O'Neill, University of Manchester
- David W. Orr, Oberlin College
- Konrad Ott, Kiel University
- John Passmore
- Val Plumwood
- Tom Regan, North Carolina State University
- John Rodman, Claremont College
- Holmes Rolston III, Colorado State University
- Ricardo Rozzi, University of North Texas and Omora Ethnobotanical Park (Universidad de Magallanes & IEB, Chile)
- Jeffrey Sachs
- Sahotra Sarkar
- David Schmidtz
- Roger Scruton
- Albert Schweitzer
- Paul Shepard, Claremont McKenna College
- Peter Singer, Princeton University
- David Skrbina, University of Michigan, Dearborn
- Richard Sylvan (originally published as Richard Routley)
- Bron Taylor, University of Florida
- Paul W. Taylor
- Paul B. Thompson
- Michael C. Tobias
- Francisco Varela
- Karen J. Warren, Macalester College
- Anthony Weston
- David Wood, Vanderbilt University
- Michael Zimmerman, University of Colorado Boulder
- Zachary A. Behlok

== See also ==
- Ecofeminism
- Environmental ethics
- Environmental philosophy
- List of philosophers
- Natural philosophy
