= Dark Green Religion =

2009 book by Bron Taylor

Dark Green Religion: Nature Spirituality and the Planetary Future
- Book cover
- Author: Bron Taylor
- Language: English
- Publisher: University of California Press
- Publication date: November 2009
- Publication place: United States
- Pages: 360
- ISBN: 978-0-520-26100-6

Dark Green Religion: Nature Spirituality and the Planetary Future is a 2009 book by the American scholar and conservationist Bron Taylor. It is about environmentalism and religiosity and argues that modern interpretations of ecology have spawned a new, global religion which attributes intrinsic value to nature. The book has been criticised for its reliance on family resemblance but its concept of dark green religion has impacted several academic fields and been described as a useful tool for analysis.

== Background ==
Bron Taylor is an American scholar and conservationist who was trained as a sociologist of religion. Attached to the University of Florida, his research has focused on religion, ecology, environmental ethics and the history and ethnography of environmentalism, surf culture and what he calls "earth-based spirituality". Before the publication of Dark Green Religion: Nature Spirituality and the Planetary Future, his influence on his fields included his role as editor-in-chief of the volume Encyclopedia of Religion and Nature (2005), which inspired the creation of the International Society for the Study of Religion, Nature and Culture, which Taylor led from its creation in 2006 until 2009, and its Journal for the Study of Religion, Nature and Culture, which Taylor has edited since its founding in 2007. He took part in creating a graduate program in "Religion and Nature" at the University of Florida.

== Summary ==
Dark Green Religion is about modern understandings of ecology, environmentalism and how they may cross over into religious views. The book surveys the history of concepts such as ecospirituality, nature religion and divisions between institutional religions and inwardly turned spirituality, focusing on North America and especially the 1970s. It covers the idea of an emerging green global religion, which attributes intrinsic value to nature and treats environmentalist ideals as religious obligations. This type of religiosity, which Taylor calls dark green religion (DGR), is distinct from the incorporation of environmental concerns in already established religions. He uses the word "dark" in reference to both the deep commitment of its adherents and their occasional turns to violence, misanthropy and apocalypticism. Taylor argues that DGR can manifest itself through neopagan religious groups, but also without an overtly religious identity through cultural products and popular media. Elements of it can exist in political activism, with examples such as the primitivism of John Zerzan, the radical environmentalism of Derrick Jensen and among the contributors to the magazine Orion.

== Reception ==
Arthur Versluis wrote that Taylor does not focus much on the connections between popular expressions and political radicalism, but contributes to the effort to describe and give a name to an international phenomenon that seems to be growing. In Studies in Religion, Sarah Lynn Kleeb questioned Taylor's reliance on family resemblance to define the book's subject, and how he analyzes people as adherents of a religion because they have convictions that "resemble religious characteristics", writing that this approach raises concerns for scholars of religion.

Analyzing the influence of Dark Green Religion in 2022, Kocku von Stuckrad wrote that the book has made an impact in multiple disciplines, many scholars have found its thesis compelling and it stands out as Taylor's most influential work. Stuckrad wrote that Taylor's "discursive arrangement" continues to be relevant, citing several books that had become bestsellers since Dark Green Religion was published and correspond well to Taylor's description, including works of popular science and the novel The Overstory by Richard Powers. Stuckrad argued that Taylor's dark green religion concept has proven itself as a useful tool for analysis and illuminates the mutual influence between spirituality and academia, co-existing with a trend in academia where the connotations of animism have changed to become positive.
