= Diego Ramirez Islands & Drake Passage National Park =

National Park in the Drake Passage

Diego Ramírez Islands and Drake Passage National Park
- IUCN category II (national park)
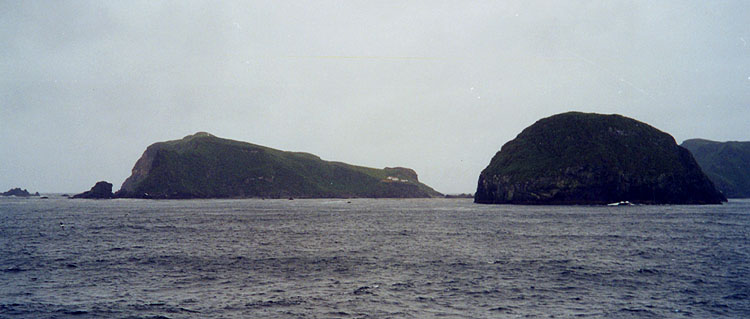
- Diego Ramirez Islands
- Location of DR & DP National Park
- Location: Drake Passage, Chile
- Nearest city: Puerto Williams
- Area: 14,439,060 ha (35,679,694 acres)
- Established: 2018 (as marine park); 2025 (as national park)
- Governing body: Corporación Nacional Forestal, Chile

The Diego Ramírez Islands and Drake Passage National Park (formerly the Islas Diego Ramírez-Drake Passage Marine Park) is a national park of Chile established in 2018 as a marine park and redesignated as a national park in 2025. It lies south of the Tierra del Fuego archipelago, surrounding the Diego Ramírez Islands. Administratively, it belongs to Antártica Chilena Province in the Magallanes y la Antártica Chilena Region.

The park spans 14,439,060 ha and aims to conserve subantarctic oceanic ecosystems, pelagic bird habitat (including the wandering albatross Diomedea exulans and southern fulmar Fulmarus glacialoides), marine mammals, and distinctive geomorphological features such as shallow seamounts associated with the circulation of the Southern Ocean. It complements the Cape Horn Biosphere Reserve.

== History ==
The park proposal emerged from long-term research based in Puerto Williams by the Subantarctic Biocultural Conservation Program (University of Magallanes and Omora Foundation), together with national and international collaborators. This work highlighted the exceptional value of the Drake Passage and its chain of adjacent seamounts for science and conservation, leading to the 2018 designation alongside other southern marine protected areas.

== Management and governance ==
The park is administered by the Government of Chile in accordance with its founding decree and environmental law, with coordination among the Ministry of the Environment (Chile), the maritime authority and the regional government. Management objectives include: (i) protecting representative oceanographic processes and pelagic-benthic habitats of the Drake Passage; (ii) safeguarding key species and vulnerable habitats associated with seamounts; (iii) enabling long-term research and monitoring; and (iv) contributing to subantarctic ecological connectivity.

== Geography ==
The park sits within the corridor of the Antarctic Circumpolar Current (ACC), with dynamic fronts such as the Subantarctic Front structuring biogeochemistry and productivity. The Drake Passage acts as a choke point between South America and the Antarctic Peninsula, concentrating jets, meanders and mesoscale eddies and receiving frontal systems originating over the Bellingshausen Sea and Amundsen Sea, which modulate swell, prevailing westerlies and air-sea exchanges.

=== Geology and submarine relief ===
The Drake Passage seafloor is not a uniform plain; it includes ridges, trenches and numerous seamounts. Recent mapping by the British Antarctic Survey details the regional bathymetry and geologic setting, highlighting features that rise thousands of metres from abyssal depths; among them, the Sars Seamount.

Globally, seamounts intensify currents, retain plankton and provide hard substrates that support long-lived benthic assemblages (habitat-forming corals and sponges), fish aggregations and megafauna. They have been described as biodiversity and biomass hotspots in multiple basins. In the southeast Pacific (Nazca-Desventuradas and Juan Fernández Archipelago), studies document endemic communities, fish aggregations and vulnerability to disturbance, supporting protection as marine protected areas. Within the park, shallow summits such as Sars likely play analogous ecological roles in the southern Atlantic sector of the Southern Ocean.

=== Sars Seamount ===
South of the Diego Ramírez archipelago, Sars Seamount (Sars Seamount) has a summit ~100 m below sea level and rises roughly 4,000 m above the surrounding seafloor. Based on recent bathymetric compilations and Martinic (2019), its position is approximately 59°43′S 68°50′W, about 200 nautical miles (370 km) south of Águila Islet in Diego Ramírez. The shallow surface hosts rich benthic fauna, including large sponges and fossil corals, providing evidence used to discuss ancient biogeographic connections between Antarctica and South America.

=== The “Elizabeth Island” in historical sources ===
Several accounts of Francis Drake’s circumnavigation (1577-1580) mention the sighting and brief visit in 1578 to a phantom island named Elizabeth during heavy derivations after leaving the Strait of Magellan. Reported coordinates place the land far offshore, southwest of Cape Horn, but it was never reliably observed again. Modern historiography debates its location and nature, proposing explanations for its “disappearance” ranging from volcanic/tectonic processes to compounded cartographic error. Within this context, the recent characterization of Sars and sondages over features such as the Pactolus/Burnham bank (1885) have been noted as possible geomorphological “clues”, though identification of Elizabeth Island with any specific bathymetric feature remains unproven.

== Flora ==
Vegetation in this territory exhibits high endemism due to harsh climatic conditions. It is dominated by graminoids, peat-forming plants and diminutive lichens and mosses adapted to cold, windy environments. There are no native forests on the islands; the southernmost forests occur on nearby Hornos Island within the Cape Horn National Park.

== Fauna ==
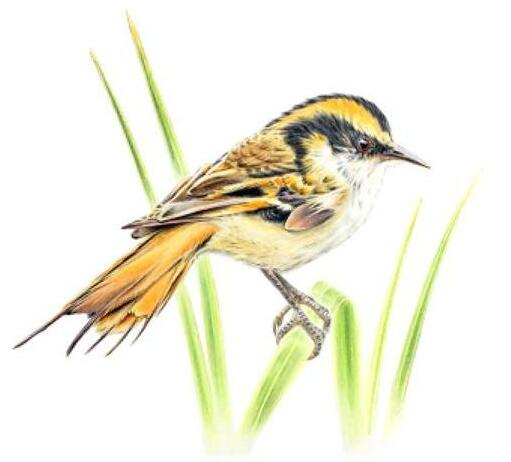
Aphrastura subantarctica, the subantarctic rayadito, endemic to the Diego Ramírez Islands.

Birds dominate the fauna; the wandering albatross (Diomedea exulans)—the largest flying bird with a wingspan up to 3.5 m—is iconic in the area. Large numbers of penguins also occur. The archipelago is the only known home of the subantarctic rayadito (Aphrastura subantarctica, described in 2022). There are no native resident land mammals, making this one of the few island groups without recorded invasive terrestrial fauna. Marine mammals such as elephant seals and other pinnipeds are present.

The conservation degree carried by the National Park category takes importance because this is one of the only sites worldwide without Introduced species yet.

== Access ==
The park is not open to regular visitors, but cruise ships en route to Antarctica may approach the islands without landings.

== Strategic relevance ==
Given its position at Chile's southern tip along the Drake Passage corridor, the park adds representation of subantarctic oceanic ecosystems to the national protected-areas system and helps safeguard ecological functions near the limit of the EEZ. Protection of shallow seamounts and pelagic habitats contributes to environmental integrity in an area of international maritime transit and provides a platform for Southern Ocean scientific cooperation.

== See also ==
- Cape Horn Biosphere Reserve
- Cabo de Hornos, Chile
- Drake Passage
