= Arcadian ecology =

School of thought that advocates for a harmonious relationship between humans and nature

Arcadian ecology is a school of thought that advocates for a harmonious relationship between humans and nature. It is named for the mountainous Arcady region of Greece. Gilbert White's seminal piece "Natural History of Selbourne" promotes a benign attitude towards nature and advocates for a peaceful coexistence between organisms. It was an individual realization of ancient arcadian ideas of harmonious interactions between humans and nature. The evolution of Arcadian ecological thought continuously reverts to the detailed letters and poems in this work.

The harmonious relationship described by Arcadian ecology establishes a responsibility to resist the domination of nature. Donald Worster in his book, Nature's Economy: A History of Ecological Ideas, uses Imperial ecology as a counterpoint to Arcadian ecology. Imperial ecology takes a different approach, and suggests that humans should attempt to manage nature, because nature exists for man's benefit (utilitarianism). This contradiction is representative of the ecologists' struggle to explain humanity's relationship with nature while considering popular theological views of the time period. The discussion of Arcadian versus Imperial ecology would continue with prominent figures of the field such as Henry David Thoreau and Charles Darwin. The long term implications of this debate have the potential to shape nature in the future as humans struggle with ethical debates and laws for preservation.

== History ==
The Arcadian standpoint has its roots in several historical and cultural traditions which have shaped the study of ecology. One of these cultural traditions was the Renaissance, which cultivated the appreciation of landscape, wilderness, and nature. Environmental sociologist Kris van Koppen underscores this point by arguing, "The social theories that belong to the arcadian approach are particularly orientated to the recognition, elaboration and extension of the intrinsic values of nature, as well as to the social organization of their preservation".

Arcadian ecology can be understood by its contrasts with another prominent view, Imperial Ecology. Sociologists and historians define Imperial Ecology as the standpoint that nature is a force to be dominated in the quest for human convenience. It is in this difference that it can be clearly seen that the arcadian approach criticizes 'resourcism' and 'reductionism'. Therefore, sociologists and ecologists who subscribe to the notion of arcadian ecology view natural disasters like the Dust Bowl as stemming directly from conceptions of nature like imperial ecology.

Within arcadian ecological thought, there has been a recent focus on the relationship between humans and animals. This comes primarily from Keith Tomas and his work Man and the Natural World: Changing Attitudes in England 1500–1800 published in 1983. This contribution began to highlight animal rights and the inhumane treatment of animals between 1500 and 1800. In a similar vein, Lynn White reflected on the shift from the biblical idea that animals were put on earth to serve man, to the realization that man must live in harmony with beast.

== Ethical implications ==
Ethical and political implications of the Arcadian Ecology viewpoint are ever popular in scholarly and media debates during the twenty-first century. The debate however, did not begin during the current time but rather has progressed over many centuries as humans attempt to grapple with their short-term and long-term environmental impact. Max Oelschlaeger remarks, "Nearly 50 years ago Aldo Leopold identified the basic problem of conservation: learn how to live on the land without spoiling it". It would also not even be fifteen years later when Rachel Carson wrote about Neanderthal science and its unreflective practitioners.

=== United States conservation debate ===
A more reflective look at the United States' environmental practices can show in depth the struggle of a relatively new country, with substantial economic means, to come to an agreement on appropriate actions regarding nature. Historically the United States has had significant expansion and over-resourcing. The many national parks and government-protected environmental lands were in part created because there was over-farming and development. Teddy Roosevelt used his position as the United States President to set aside more than 194 million acres of park land. Karl Jacoby, an expert in environmental history, has written how the Adirondack Park in New York was created to ensure a continued water source to the New York City population and a natural environment to “recharge” from city life.

Not all United States National Parks were created for reasons other than nature preservation, such as Yosemite National Park. Originally it was set aside as land to be undeveloped by those who predicted that land conservation may become important in the future. For classification purposes, those ecologists that saw a need to refuse a developmental and destructive path for Yellowstone ascribe to the arcadian ecology view. However, this originally Arcadian movement was opposed, when San Francisco need a viable water supply after a devastating earthquake. This conservation issue sparked a major debate over the Hetch Hetchy. The debate pitted major thinkers against each other including John Muir who thought there was "no holier temple than Yosemite" and Gifford Pinchot who was in favor of damming to provide water resources to San Francisco. The Hetch Hetchy examines the dichotomy of arcadian and imperial ecology.

In addition to National Parks, the United States has put many laws into motion regarding environmental protection including the National Environmental Policy Act (1969), the Wilderness Act (1964), and the Endangered Species Act (1973). These laws all celebrate the Arcadian harmony between nature and humans and ensure its preservation. Unfortunately, Americans, according to Max Oelschlaeger, are also, "the world’s leading consumers: our ecological footprints tread heavily on other parts of the planet".

One of the major problems in determining if there has been success in terms of the environment in the United States is the subjectivity that comes with this environmental issue. A look at the work by Eliot Brownlee, a professor of economic history, will suggest that the United States is an economic success story that utilized the natural resources to the best of their abilities. The view looks at nature not as a pawn, but a means to an end in production which has advanced the human race further than ever thought possible. In opposition, a prominent environmental philosopher, Joseph Petulla, wrote a different story of the landscape of Brownlee. He saw the economic success coming at a costly price of the destruction of the American land. Western civilization had encroached too far into nature and it was more reminiscent of Imperial Ecology rather than Arcadian Ecology.

== See also ==
- Coexistence theory
