= Nature religion =

Religious movement

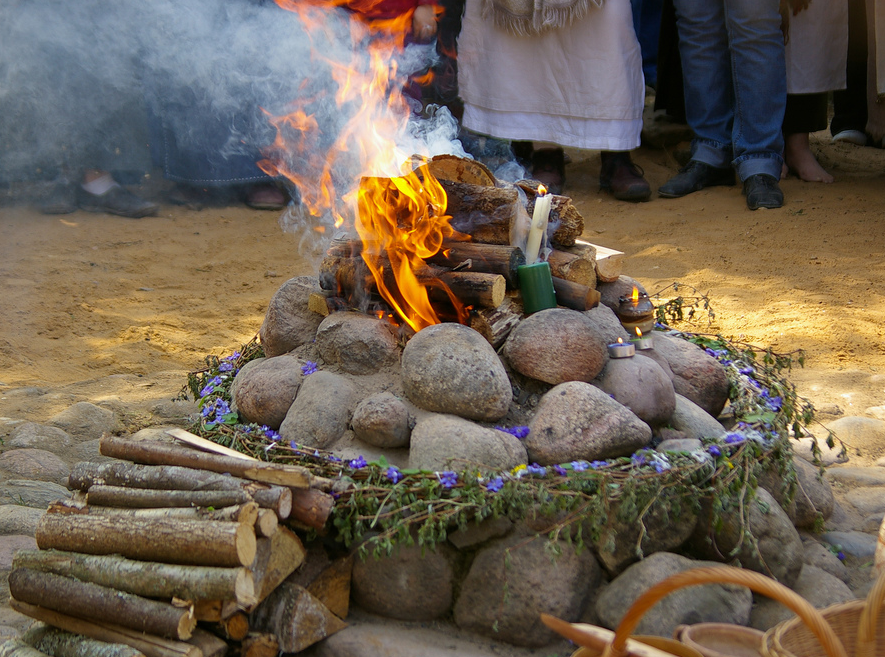
An aukuras, a type of fire altar found in Romuva, a modern Lithuanian Pagan faith characterised as a "nature religion".

A nature religion is a religious movement that believes nature and the natural world is an embodiment of divinity, sacredness or spiritual power. Nature religions include indigenous religions practiced in various parts of the world by cultures who consider the environment to be imbued with spirits and other sacred entities. It also includes modern Pagan faiths, which are primarily concentrated in Europe and North America.

The term "nature religion" was coined by the American religious studies scholar Catherine Albanese, who used it in her work Nature Religion in America: From the Algonkian Indians to the New Age (1991), and she later went on to use it in other studies. After Albanese developed the term, it has been used by other academics working in the discipline.

== Definition ==
Catherine Albanese described nature religion as "a symbolic center and the cluster of beliefs, behaviours, and values that encircles it", deeming it to be useful for shining a light on aspects of history that are rarely viewed as religious. In a paper on the subject, Canadian religious studies scholar Peter Beyer described nature religion as a "useful analytical abstraction" to refer to "any religious belief or practice in which devotees consider nature to be the embodiment of divinity, sacredness, transcendence, spiritual power, or whatever cognate term one wishes to use". He went on to note that in this way nature religion was not an "identifiable religious tradition" like Buddhism or Christianity, but that it instead covers "a range of religious and quasi-religious movements, groups and social networks whose participants may or may not identify with one of the many constructed religions of global society which referred to many other nature religion."

"[I]ncluded under the heading of nature religion would be modern witchcraft/Wicca and neo-Paganism, various revitalised aboriginal spiritual traditions, movements that appropriate aspects of aboriginal spirituality but consist mostly of non-aboriginals, neo-shamanistic groups, various portions of environmental movements, some feminist movements, certain 'New Age' movements, and movement within traditional religions such as Christian creation spirituality. This list could vary somewhat and I certainly do not want to suggest that such classification is an unambiguous matter."

— Peter Beyer, 1998.

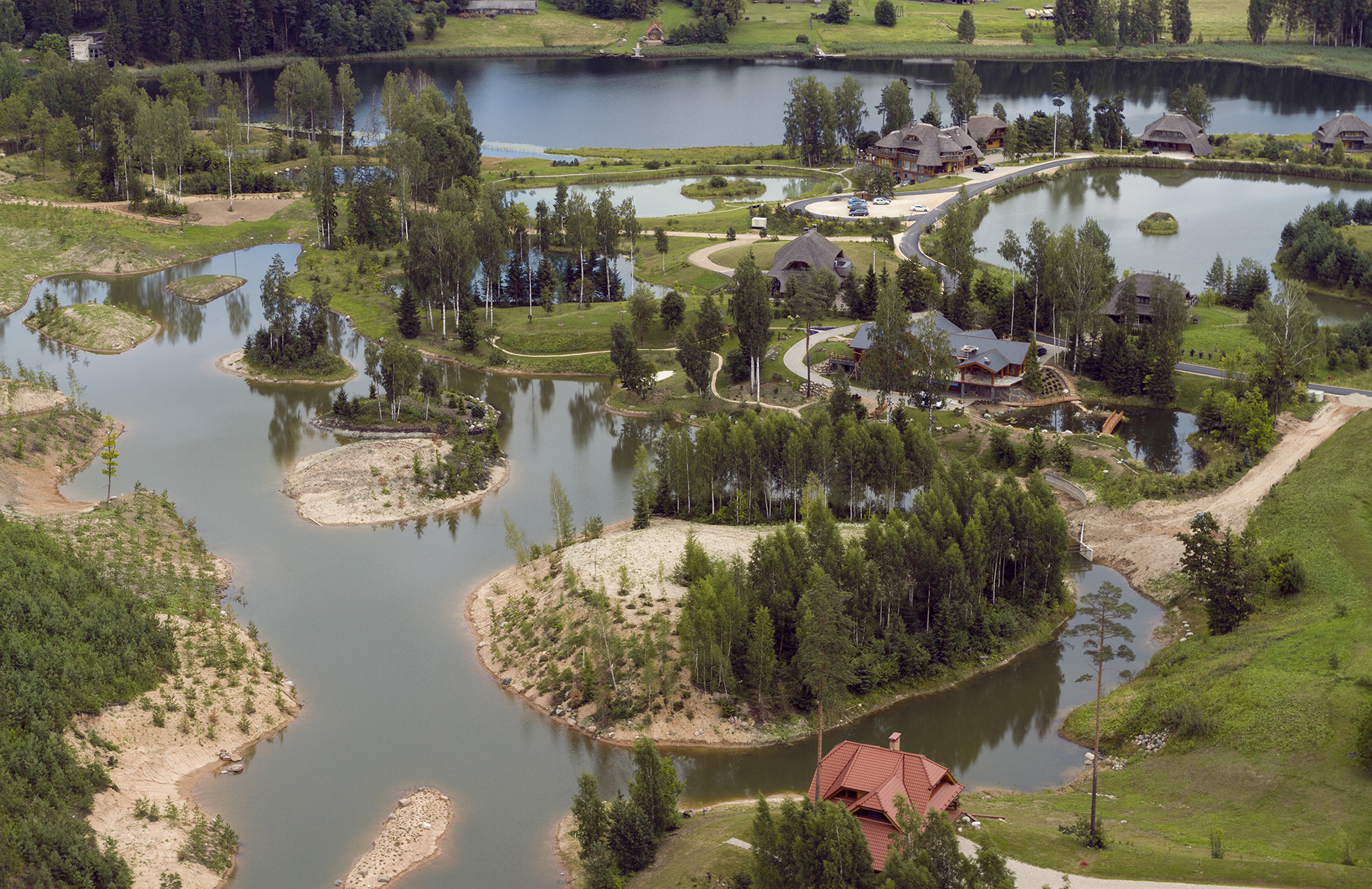
Amatciems, a settlement of Ringing Cedars' Anastasians in Drabeši Parish, Latvia. Anastasianism is a Russian-originated modern Pagan movement that sacralises environmental and human nativity (Rod), and is therefore regarded as a "nature religion".

=== Common characteristics ===
Peter Beyer noted a series of common characteristics he believed were shared by different nature religions. He remarked that although "one must be careful not to overgeneralise", he suspected that there was a series of features which "occur sufficiently often" in those nature religions known to recorded scholarship to constitute a pattern.

The first of these common characteristics was nature religion's "comparative resistance to institutionalisation and legitimisation in terms of identifiable socio-religious authorities and organisations", meaning that nature religionists rarely formed their religious beliefs into large, visible socio-political structures such as churches. Furthermore, Beyer noted, nature religionists often held a "concomitant distrust of and even eschewing of politically orientated power". Instead of this, he felt that among nature religious communities, there was "a valuing of community as non-hierarchical" and a "conditional optimism with regard to human capacity and the future."

In the sphere of the environment, Beyer noted that nature religionists held to a "holistic conception of reality" and "a valorisation of physical place as vital aspects of their spiritualities". Similarly, Beyer noted the individualism which was favoured by nature religionists. He remarked that those adhering to such beliefs typically had respect for "charismatic and hence purely individual authority" and placed a "strong emphasis on individual paths," leading them to believe in "the equal value of individuals and groups". Along similar lines, he also commented on the "strong experiential basis" of nature-religionist beliefs, in which personal experience is the final arbiter of truth or validity.

== Use within academia ==
In April 1996, the University of Lancaster in North West England held a conference on contemporary Paganism entitled "Nature Religion Today: Western Paganism, Shamanism and Esotericism in the 1990s", and ultimately led to the publication of an academic anthology of the same name two years later. This book, Nature Religion Today: Paganism in the Modern World, was edited by members of the University's Department of Religious Studies, a postgraduate named Joanne Pearson and two professors, Richard H. Roberts and Geoffrey Samuel.

In his study of Wicca, the Pagan studies scholar Ethan Doyle White expressed the view that the category of "nature religion" was problematic from a "historical perspective" because it solely emphasises the "commonalities of belief and attitude to the natural world" that are found between different religions and in doing so divorces these different belief systems from their distinctive socio-cultural and historical backgrounds.

== See also ==
- Dark green religion
- Deep ecology
- Natural religion
- Naturalism (philosophy)
- Naturalistic pantheism
- Religious naturalism
- Animism
