= Gilbert LaFreniere =

American ecological philosopher (1934–2025)

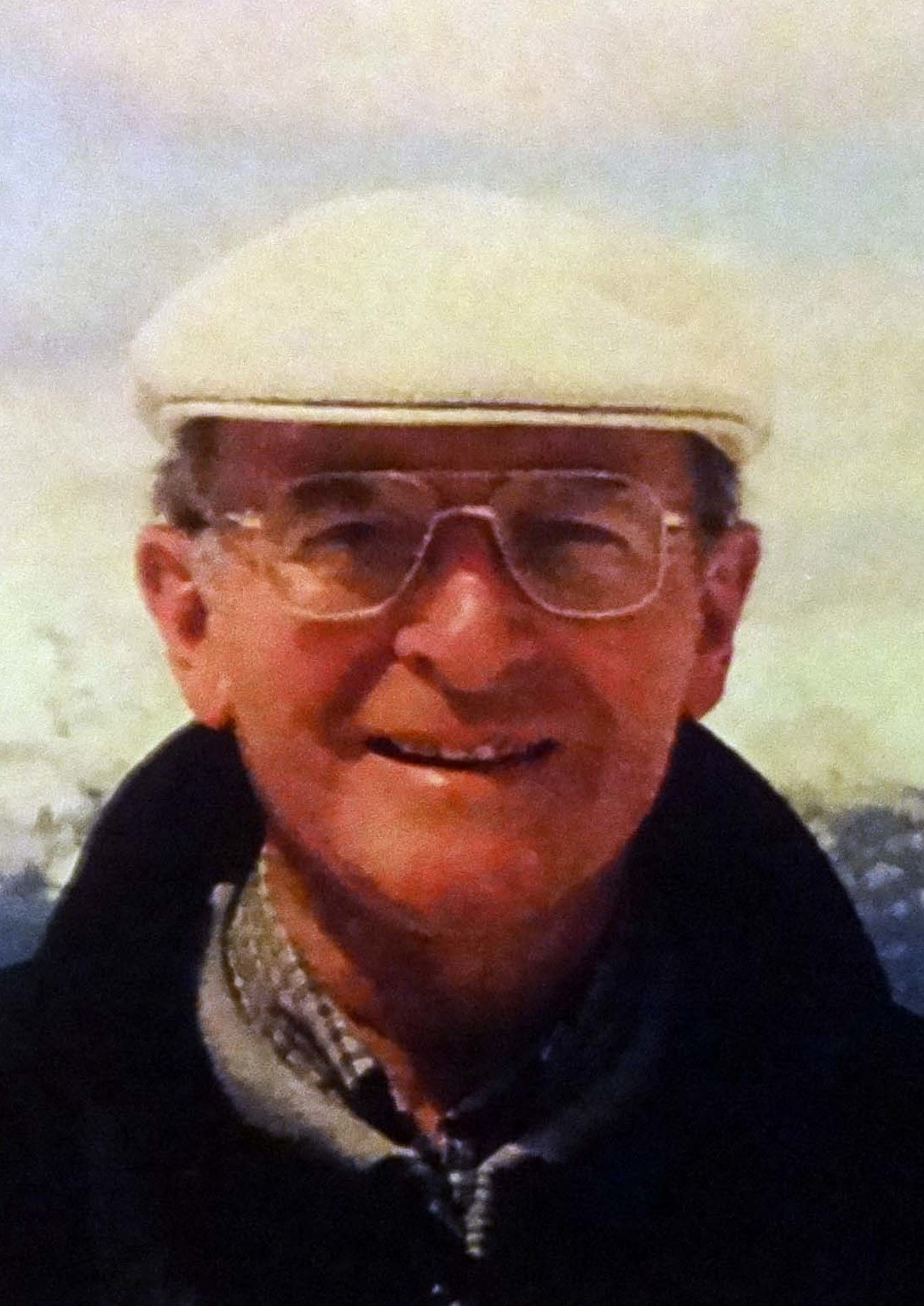
- Gil in the Canadian Rockies
- Born: Gilbert Francis LaFreniere; September 23, 1934
- Died: May 24, 2025 (aged 90); Salem, Oregon, U.S.
- Occupation: American ecological philosopher

Gilbert Francis LaFreniere (September 23, 1934 – May 24, 2025) was an American ecological philosopher, active in the study of geology, ecology, and human impact upon nature.

== Life and career ==
Gilbert was born in New York City on September 23, 1934. He attended the University of Massachusetts Amherst and earned a Masters of Geology from Dartmouth College before completing a Ph.D. in intellectual history from the University of California at Santa Barbara, (UCSB) in 1976.

LaFreniere taught geology, environmental ethics, and environmental history for more than twenty-five years at Willamette University in Salem, Oregon. He remained an active Professor Emeritus and continued to lecture on the transformation of natural landscapes by man, appearing at Willamette University, Portland State University, and Oregon State University in the last few years. Many of his lectures relied heavily on his own travels and photography of the national parks of Europe, New England, California, the Pacific Northwest, and Canada.

LaFreniere was also a noted scholar of the work and thought of the French philosopher Jean-Jacques Rousseau and the Idea of Progress and appears in the Card Catalog of the Rousseau Library in Montmorency, France. Gilbert's most recent books are The Decline of Nature (2008) and Whatever Keeps You Vertical (2017). Among his other publications are the book Jean Jacques Rousseau and the Idea of Progress (1976) and articles in Environmental History Review, Agriculture and Human Values, and The Trumpeter.

LaFreniere died on May 24, 2025, at the age of 90.

== See also ==
- Environmental ethics
- Natural philosophy
- List of environmental philosophers
- List of historians of science
