= Natural religion =

Concept in religious anthropology

Natural religion most frequently means the "religion of nature", in which God, the soul, spirits, and all objects of the supernatural are considered as part of nature and not separate from it. Sometimes "natural religion" is taken to mean a pantheistic belief that nature itself is divine; conversely, the term is also used in philosophy to describe some aspects of religion that are said to be knowable apart from divine revelation through logic and reason alone, for example, the existence of the unmoved Mover, the first cause of the universe.

Most authors consider natural religion as not only the foundation of monotheistic religions such as Judaism, Christianity, Islam, and the Baháʼí Faith, but also distinct from them. According to some authors, aspects of natural religion are found universally among all peoples, often in such forms as shamanism and animism. They are still practiced in many parts of the world. The religions of Native American societies for example are considered as possessing some aspects of natural religion.

== Definition ==
Natural religion might have the following meanings:

- In the modern study of religion it is used to refer to the notion that there is a spontaneous religious apprehension of the world common to all human beings, see:
  - urreligion
  - origin of religion
  - anthropology of religion
- As a reverent form of nature worship, embodied in a statement by Frank Lloyd Wright: "I put a capital N on Nature, and call it my Church."
- Referring to the religions of people prior to their Christianization.

== History ==
The basic tenets of natural religion were outlined by Aristotle, in whose hylomorphism all things are made of matter and form. The form of each living thing is the soul, which guides and directs its development. Many natural religions consider God to be the "soul of the universe".

Early monotheism had many naturalistic elements. Heaven and hell were thought of as physical places above and below the earth and "salvation" was expected to bring resurrection of the body.

In the fourth century, Christians were concerned that Jesus had not returned and wondered what happened to those who died before the Second Coming of Christ. Christians, led by Augustine of Hippo and under the influence of both gnosticism and neoplatonism, developed a new belief in the soul as capable of a separate existence abstract from the material world. The human souls, unlike those of animals, would survive death and, depending on God's judgment, be transferred to the non-material realms of heaven or hell and the new realm of limbo for unbaptized persons and purgatory for those who do not deserve hell but are not purified for heaven.

Another distinction from monotheism is found in the Christian belief in miracles, in which God intervenes in history from outside nature. Ancient Roman philosophers and others since objected to this Christian doctrine as God violating his own natural laws. Christians had to separate God more completely from the natural universe in order to show how this could be possible. There were similar neo-platonist tendencies in Judaism and Islam, which also saw God as acting in history.

Natural religions, on the contrary, consider the supernatural as part of the natural universe.

The philosopher David Hume referred to mathematics, natural philosophy and natural religion as all dependent on a scientific understanding of man, and all liable to be improved in the light of an improved understanding of human nature.

== Modern views ==
One of the first attempts to develop a science of religion was The Varieties of Religious Experience, by the American philosopher William James. James saw the basic experience which unified all religions as a sometimes life-changing personal event in which one perceives the connectedness of all things as one unified whole.

James defined the basics of all religion, including natural religion, when he wrote:

Were one to characterize the life of religion in the broadest and most general terms possible, one might say that it exists of the belief that there is an unseen order, and that our supreme good lies in harmoniously adjusting ourselves hereto.

Certain aspects of natural religion (that is, religious truths that are knowable by human reason alone) are found among different cultures, though not always entirely intact, and to varying degrees, according to philosophers such as Thomas Aquinas and Malebranche.

== See also ==
- Natural theology – Theology reliant on rational and empirical arguments, often synonymous in the 18th and 19th centuries; see, for example, David Hume's Dialogues Concerning Natural Religion.
- Nature religion – Religious movement
- Original monotheism – Hypothesis proposing monotheism as the original religion of humanity
- Perennial philosophy – Idea that all religions share a single truth
- Rational mysticism – Metaphysical theory
- Spiritual but not religious – Philosophy
- Naturalistic spirituality – Combined philosophy of spirituality and naturalism
- Naturalism (philosophy) – Belief that only natural laws and forces operate in the universe
- Religious naturalism – Naturalism in religion
- Naturalistic pantheism – Form of pantheism
- Pantheism – Belief that God and reality are identical

== Bibliography ==
- Concerning Natural Religion by William Wallace Fenn, The Harvard Theological Review, vol. 4, no. 4, 1911, pp. 460–476.
- Chignell, Andrew; Pereboom, Derk Natural Theology and Natural Religion
- Britannica Online, quote: "...what can be called natural religion, the acceptance of a certain body of religious knowledge that is inborn in every person or that can be acquired by the use of reason and the rejection of religious knowledge when it is acquired through either revelation or the teaching of any church. ... Natural religion was sufficient and certain".
- Natural Religion and the Nature of Religion by Peter Byrne
