= Journal for the Study of Religion, Nature and Culture =

- Discipline: Religious Studies
- Language: English
- Edited by: Bron Taylor

Publication details
- History: 2007–present (viewed as continuation of Ecotheology, published 1996–2006)
- Publisher: International Society for the Study of Religion, Nature & Culture (United States)
- Frequency: Quarterly (March, June, September, December)

Standard abbreviations
- ISO 4: J. Study Relig. Nat. Cult.

Indexing
- ISSN: 1749-4907 (print); 1749-4915 (web)
- OCLC no.: 938264566

Links
- Journal homepage; Online access; Online archive (JSRNC and Ecotheology)

The Journal for the Study of Religion, Nature and Culture (JSRNC) is a peer-reviewed academic journal on religious studies. The journal is the official journal of the International Society for the Study of Religion, Nature and Culture. The idea for the journal emerged during the preparation of the interdisciplinary Encyclopedia of Religion and Nature.

JSRNC was described in its founding editor's inaugural editorial as a "reframed" version of a predecessor journal named Ecotheology (ISSN 1363-7320). From 1996 to 2006, Ecotheology had published eleven volumes that are now archived and available at the website of JSRNC.

The journal JSRNC is indexed or abstracted by the following services:

- Scopus Abstract and Citation Database
- ATLA Religion Database
- Religious and Theological Abstracts
- European Reference Index for the Humanities (ERIH Plus)
- EBSCO's Academic Search Premier & Religion and Philosophy Collection
- Bibliography of Humanities and Social Sciences Literature, K.G. Saur Verlag
- Emerging Sources Citation Index (ESCI)
- Index to the Study of Religions Online
