= Max Oelschlaeger =

American ecological philosopher (born 1943)

Max Oelschlaeger (born in 1943 in Kansas) is an American ecological philosopher, active in the study of Environmental Ethics, Environmental Philosophy, Ecofeminism, Deep Ecology, Philosophy of Ecology, Contemporary Environmental Issues, Postmodern Environmental Ethics, and the Philosophy of Wilderness.

== Biography ==
Max Oelschlaeger attended Southern Illinois University from 1965 to 1973 earning a Ph.D. in Philosophy

Oelschlaeger has authored numerous journal articles, encyclopedia references, and several books. He is affiliated with the Center for Environmental Philosophy at the University of North Texas. He also leads workshops and gives lectures at universities around the country. Past lectures include appearances at Evergreen State College in Washington State, Bates University in Maine, and Salisbury University in Maryland.

== List of books ==
- Caring for Creation: An Ecumenical Approach to the Environmental Crisis. Yale University Press, 1994. Paper back edition by Yale University Press, 1996.
- The Idea of Wilderness: From Prehistory to the Age of Ecology. New Haven: Yale University Press, 1991. Paper back edition by Yale University Press, 1993.
- The Environmental Imperative: A Socio-Economic Perspective. Washington, D.C.: University Press of America, 1977.

== List of books edited ==
- Postmodern Environmental Ethics. Albany: State University of New York Press, 1995.
- The Company of Others: Essays in Honor of Paul Shepard. Durango, Col.: Kivaki Publishing, 1995.
- The Wilderness Condition: Essays on Environment and Civilization. San Francisco: Sierra Club Books, 1992. Paper back edition by Island Press, 1992.
- After Earth Day: Continuing the Conservation Effort. Denton: University of North Texas Press, 1992. Paper back edition by UNT Press, 1992. Books (in process)
- Texas Land Ethics, with Pete A. Y. Gunter, University of Texas Press (forthcoming, 1996).
- Nature's Odyssey: Essays on Environment and Wilderness, for Yale University Press (expected completion, early 1996).

== See also ==
- ecological philosophy
- Environmental ethics
- Environmental philosophy
- Ecofeminism
- Natural philosophy
- List of Environmental Philosophers
