= Cape Horn Biosphere Reserve =

Protected area in Chile

- Cabo de Hornos Biosphere Reserve
- Location within Chile
- Location: South Chile
- Coordinates: 55.25°S 69.5°W
- Area: 49,000 km^{2} (19,000 sq mi)

The Cape Horn Biosphere Reserve (Cabo de Hornos Biosphere Reserve) is located in the extreme south of Chile and comprises marine areas, islands, fjords, channels, forests and moorland. It covers an area of approximately 49,000 km^{2} (19,000 sq mi). All biosphere reserves include core zones (no significant infrastructure development), buffer zones (light development) and transition zones (more traditional development under a sustainable rubric). In the case of Cape Horn Biosphere Reserve, the core zone is constituted of Alberto de Agostini National Park and Cabo de Hornos National Park, which are strictly protected under Chilean law and under the biosphere reserve status cannot have infrastructure for lodging.

The Cape Horn Biosphere Reserve is administered by a Governing Board that is presided by the regional governor and includes relevant public services and local organizations. The reserve's scientific advisory board is coordinated by the Omora Ethnobotanical Park - University of Magallanes. In addition to hosting the world's southernmost forested ecosystems and culture (the Yahgans), the Cape Horn Archipelago also protects 5% of the world's bryophyte diversity (mosses and liverworts). While considered one of the world's last remaining wilderness areas, Cape Horn currently is confronting serious threats related to tourism, development of real estate projects, invasive exotic species and salmon farming.

Interactive map of Cape Horn Biosphere Reserve.

== See also ==
- List of environment topics
- World Network of Biosphere Reserves
- Diego Ramirez Islands & Drake Passage National Park
