= Bron Taylor =

American academic and conservationist (born 1955)

Bron Raymond Taylor (born 15 April 1955) is an American scholar and conservationist. He is professor of religion and nature at the University of Florida and has also been an affiliated scholar with the Center for Environment and Development at the University of Oslo. Taylor works principally in the areas of religion and ecology, environmental ethics and environmental philosophy. He is also a prominent historian and ethnographer of environmentalism and especially radical environmentalist movements, surfing culture and nature-based spiritualities. Taylor is also editor-in-chief of the Encyclopedia of Religion and Nature and subsequently founded the International Society for the Study of Religion, Nature and Culture, serving as its president from 2006 to 2009. He also founded the society's affiliated Journal for the Study of Religion, Nature and Culture, serving as its editor since 2007.

== Dark green religion ==
Taylor is credited with coining the term "dark green religion" or "dark green spirituality", which he broadly defines as a religion, or a "religion-resembling" set of beliefs and practices, characterized by a central conviction that "nature is sacred, has intrinsic value, and is therefore due reverent care." Tied in with this belief is a felt kinship with non-human entities and a conscious awareness of the interconnected and interdependent nature of life on the planet. Taylor argues that dark green religion possesses many of the characteristics of established religions, such as sacred texts (a book such as Walden, for example), prophets (writers and activists such as Henry David Thoreau, John Muir and Rachel Carson), rituals ("soul surfers" meeting the ocean at dawn) and elements some consider dangerous (radical "eco-terrorists"). Dark green religion also has an inherently political component with regards to environmentalism; the idea that nature is sacred comes with an ethical responsibility to treat it as such.

As outlined in Dark Green Religion: Nature Spirituality and the Planetary Future, Taylor asserts that belief in the sacrality of nature may or may not involve a belief in supernatural beings or forces. An atheist who reads evolution as an epic narrative of spiritual significance may be engaging in dark green religion, as would a pantheist who is humbled by the structure of the cosmos. Those who perceive the Earth to be like an organism if not also a sentient being (Gaianism), or intuit that animals and trees possess spiritual intelligences (animism), may also be viewed as engaging in dark green religion, according to Taylor. Dark green religion often finds common ground with religious traditions such as paganism and shamanism, as well as philosophical belief systems such as deep ecology, Aldo Leopold's theory of land ethic, and James Lovelock's Gaia hypothesis.

Taylor's conviction that "religion" is a paradigm that can be understood to include entirely naturalistic worldviews puts him at odds with many of the new atheist thinkers such as Christopher Hitchens and especially Richard Dawkins, whom he discusses directly in his book.

Taylor contends that dark green religiosity has deep roots and has manifested itself in a diversity of ways throughout human history. He finds eco-spiritual synchronicity, for example, in phenomena as seemingly disparate as surfing magazines and the writings of Edmund Burke. Other cultural actors and elements explored by Taylor include Charles Darwin, Jane Goodall, Edward Abbey, Alice Walker, tree-sitting activists, the Earth Liberation Front, the Animal Liberation Front, Al Gore, Orion magazine and Disney films such as The Lion King and Pocahontas.

Taylor has also written about James Cameron's film Avatar and its relevance to dark green religion. He argues that the widespread popularity of the film, in which nature is regarded as sentient and sacred, is a testament to the growing appeal of dark green spirituality around the world.

Taylor also finds an emerging global receptivity to dark green religious sentiment in political institutions such as the United Nations. He has observed that, as concerns over the state of the environment intensify, global summits aimed at addressing the ecological crisis have assumed a decidedly spiritual tenor. He points to the opening ceremony of the 2002 World Summit on Sustainable Development as one example of this trend. He argues that current trends in earthen spirituality might even presage the emergence of a “civil earth religion” that promotes loyalty to the biosphere rather than to nation states.

=== Dark green versus green religion ===
Taylor makes a distinction between dark green religious phenomena (which emanate from a belief that nature is sacred), and the relatively recent "greening" of certain sectors of established religious traditions (which see eco-friendly activities as a religious obligation). Many of the central figures and seminal texts of dark green religion, as curated by Taylor, express a strong condemnation of Abrahamic theism, which, dark green religionists allege, as Lynn Townsend White, Jr. did in a famous Science essay in 1968, is deeply linked to an anthropocentric worldview that sees human beings as above nature and divinely endowed with the right to dominion over the biosphere. Those aligned in the dark green religion camp have alleged that this cosmogony has played a major role in the desecration and exploitation of the natural world.

For this reason, those engaged in dark green religion are often skeptical that conventional religions can play a constructive role in halting and reversing ecological degradation. While the environmentalist efficacy of the stewardship model, which some think is mandated by Judaism, Christianity and Islam alike, remains a hotly disputed issue, many dark green thinkers believe that efforts to preserve the ecosystem will not succeed unless underlying spiritual attitudes are shifted towards a more biocentric perspective. To this point, in a 2010 interview with the online magazine Religion Dispatches, Taylor stated, "Although it is not my intent to annoy those with conventional religious understandings, few such religionists will welcome the evidence assembled in Dark Green Religion, or my supposition based on this evidence, that eventually their religions are likely to be supplanted by naturalistic forms of nature spirituality." Taylor has thus drawn criticism from those who believe that conventional religious ethics and infrastructure can be effective agents of environmental preservation.

== Selected publications ==
- "Surfing into Spirituality and a New, Aquatic Nature Religion". Journal of the American Academy of Religion, 75(4):-951, 2007.
- "The Religion and Politics of Earth First!". The Ecologist, 21(6):258-266, November/December 1991.
- "Bioregionalism: An Ethics of Loyalty to Place". Landscape Journal, 19(1&2):50-72, 2000.
- "Earthen Spirituality or Cultural Genocide?: Radical Environmentalism's Appropriation of Native American Spirituality". Religion, 27(2):183-215, April 1997.
- "Green Apocalypticism: Understanding Disaster in the Radical Environmental Worldview". Society and Natural Resources, 12(4):377-386, June 1999.
- "Religion, Violence, and Radical Environmentalism: from Earth First! to the Unabomber to the Earth Liberation Front". Terrorism and Political Violence, 10(4):1-42, Winter 1998.
- "Earth and Nature-Based Spirituality: From Earth First! and Bioregionalism to Scientific Paganism and the New Age". Religion, 31(3):225-245, July 2001.
- "Earth and Nature-Based Spirituality: From Deep Ecology to Radical Environmentalism", Religion, 31(2):175-193, April 2001.
- "Diggers, Wolves, Ents, Elves and Expanding Universes: Bricolage, Religion, and Violence from Earth First! and the Earth Liberation Front to the Anti-Globalization Resistance". Chapter 3 in The Cultic Milieu: Oppositional Subcultures in an Age of Globalization, Eds. Jeffrey Kaplan and Heléne Lööw, Altimura, 26–74, 2002. ISBN 0-7591-0203-1
- "Resacralizing Earth: Environmental Paganism and the Restoration of Turtle Island". Chapter 3 in American Sacred Space, Eds. D. Chidester and E.T. Linenthal, Indiana University Press, Religion in America Series, 97–151, 1995. ISBN 978-0-253-21006-7
- "Deep Ecology and its Social Philosophy: A Critique", Chapter 14 in Beneath the Surface: Critical Essays on Deep Ecology. Eds. E. Katz. A. Light, D. Rothenberg, Boston, MIT Press, 269–299, 2000. ISBN 978-0-262-61149-7
- Dark Green Religion: Nature Spirituality and the Planetary Future. University of California Press, Berkeley, 2010. ISBN 978-0-520-26100-6

== See also ==
- Religious Naturalism
- Religion and environmentalism
- List of environmental philosophers
- Spiritual ecology
- Ecotheology
