= Omora Ethnobotanical Park =

Chilean Botanical Garden

Coordinates: 54°56′08″S 67°36′17″W

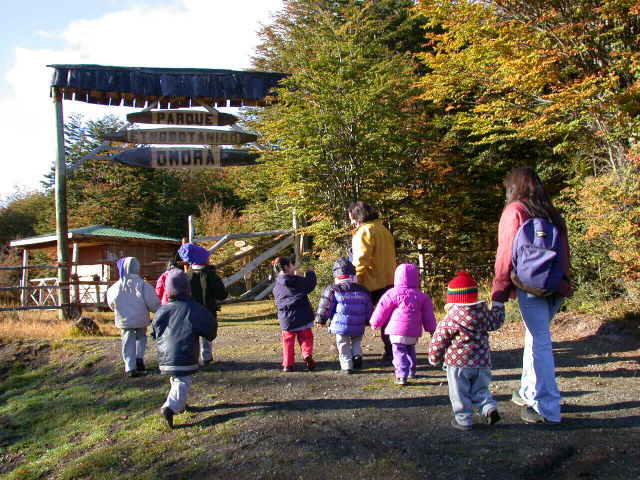
Children entering Omora Ethnobotanical Park

Omora Ethnobotanical Park is a protected area of Chile located 4 km (2 mi) west of Puerto Williams on Navarino Island in the extreme southern Magellan and Chilean Antarctica Region. The Omora Park is a research, education and conservation center for the Cape Horn Biosphere Reserve. The park itself includes a representative variety subantarctic flora open to the public for formal and information education. Within its boundaries, one can find deciduous forests (Nothofagus antarctica and Nothofagus pumilio) and evergreen broadleaf forests (Nothofagus betuloides), as well as bogs and high-Andean ecosystems and diverse mosses, lichens and liverworts (termed the "Miniature Forests of Cape Horn" by Omora Park scientists).

Since its creation in 2000, the Omora Park and its partners and colleagues have gone on to lead a transdisciplinary biocultural conservation initiative that led to the creation of the Cape Horn Biosphere Reserve. A consortium of institutions now support this program including the Omora Foundation, the Millennium Institute of Ecology and Biodiversity (IEB-Chile)and the University of Magallanes in Chile, and the University of North Texas and the Center for Environmental Philosophy in the United States. In 2008, the Omora Park received the "Science and Practice of Ecology and Society Award", given by the Foundation for Scientific Synthesis.

Founding director Dr Ricardo Rozzi inaugurated the practice of "field environmental philosophy" at the Omora Park. This way of learning is a contemporary iteration of the peripatetic school, and its appeal is that it invites participants to experientially deconstruct universal and mathematical assumptions about nature, through the rediscovery of the singular qualities of each living being, and of the inapprehensible diversity of beings. It enables students, teachers, scientists, citizens, and policy makers to recover awareness about the integral value of the lives of singular living beings beyond their mathematical representation or scientific names. The understanding gained through this educational process leads not only to a conceptual awareness of biological and cultural diversity, but also to an emotional feeling and sense of involvement. This has proven to be an experience critical for motivating politicians and decisions makers to appreciate and act positively to conserve species and their habitats.

One example of the way the Omora Park attempts to use field environmental philosophy to link theory and practice can be found in the Tourism with a Hand Lens initiative.

In spite of the achievements, the Omora Park has not been without some controversy with the local community. In 2009, the leaders of the four citizen organizations, including the Cape Horn Tourism Association, the Neighborhood Association, the Puerto Williams Fisherman's Union and the Yahgan Community of Mejillones Bay, signed an open letter to the Regional Council (Radio Polar, 10 August 2009) to contest the further expansion of the park and to question its role with the local community. On the other hand, all Regional Council members except one voted in favor of Omora Park's initiative, and the network of public and private institutions as well as other citizen organizations, including the President of the Yahgan Community of Mejillones Bay, supported the initiative of Omora Park during the meeting of the Region Government Council in 2009.

== Articles online ==
- Omora Biocultural Conservation Approach: Ecology & Society 2006
- Field environmental philosophy and biocultural conservation at the Omora Ethnobotanical Park: Methodological approaches to broaden the ways of integrating the social component(“S”) in Long-Term Socio-Ecological Research (LTSER) Sites

== Videos online ==
- The invisible Journey: Ecotourism with a Hand-Lens
- Parque Omora: Laboratorio Natural by TVN - CONICYT - CABALA
- La Medida de Omora by Claudia Esslinger
- La Medida de Omora y Los Cabos de Hornos by Claudia Esslinger
- Field Environmental Philosophy /Filosofia Ambiental de Campo: El Retorno a la Madriguera (The Return to the Den) by Jaime Sepulveda
- Belleza de Pensar Cristian Warnken, Lorenzo Aillapán y Ricardo Rozzi
- Efecto Picaflor
- Efecto Picaflor sinopsis
- TV UMAG Ecotourism with a Hand Lens - Ecoturismo con Lupa
- TV UMAG Omora LA BIODIVERSIDAD
- TV UMAG Omora VALOR INTRINSECO
- TV UMAG Omora VALOR INSTRUMENTAL
- TV UMAG Omora Turismo sustentable Parque Cabo de Hornos
- TV UMAG Omora Guia Multi Etnica de Aves Subantarticas
- Naturaleza Pajaro, Bosque Nativo - Lorenzo Aillapan by Olaf Pena Pastene
- Naturaleza Pajaro, Bosque Nativo - Ricardo Rozzi by Olaf Pena Pastene
