= Ivone Gebara =

Brazilian Catholic nun and feminist philosopher (born 1944)

Ivone Gebara (born December 9, 1944) is a Brazilian Catholic nun, philosopher, and feminist theologian. She is notable for her writing on ecofeminism.

== Biography ==
Ivone Gebara was born in São Paulo on December 9, 1944, to a family of Syrian-Lebanese descent. After receiving a degree in philosophy, she joined the Augustinian Congregation of the Sisters of Our Lady in 1967 at the age of 22. She has two doctorates, one earned from the Pontifical Catholic University of São Paulo in philosophy in 1975 and another from the Catholic University of Louvain in Belgium in religious sciences in 1998.

Gebara taught at the Instituto Teológico do Recife (ITER) for almost 17 years alongside founder Hélder Câmara. Linked to liberation theology, the institution existed from 1968 until it was closed by order of the Vatican in 1989. Since then she has devoted her time to writing and delivering courses and lectures around the world, on the foundations of religious discourse.

Since 1973 Gebara has lived in the Northeast Region. She currently lives in a poor neighborhood of Camaragibe in the Recife metropolitan area, 25 km from Recife.

=== Early life ===
In 1962, when she was only 18, Gebara begin teaching philosophy at a public college while also working as a secretary. In 1966, she obtained her degree in philosophy in São Paulo and she traveled the same year to Louvain in Belgium in order to study theology. However, her studies are promptly interrupted when she is asked to return to Brazil in 1973 to replace José Comblin, who had been exiled due to his revolutionary theology. She taught theology and philosophy at ITER (Institute of Theology in Recife) where she met Hélder Câmara, another pioneering liberation theologian who was the archbishop of Recife at the time. It also marked the beginning of her dedication to writings for the theological foundations of community development projects that focused on promoting social change through educational programs.

=== Conflict with the Church ===
In 1993, Gebara had caused a stir within the National Conference of Bishops of Brazil (CNBB) by confiding to the weekly magazine Veja that abortion was not a sin.

In 1995, her position on abortion earned Gebara an international notoriety for being silenced by the Vatican and sent for two years of theological re-education in Belgium in a theological institute, during which was subjected to forced silence (prohibition to manifest herself publicly) and was condemned for criticizing the moral teaching of the Catholic Church. During that time, she obtained her second doctorate, in Religious Studies from the Catholic University of Louvain in Belgium. Gebara wrote a book addressing evil, Rompendo o silêncio: uma fenomenologia feminista do mal.

Her critical attitude is rejected in many religious circles, often by people who do not question the presuppositions that are the basis of the theological reflection of the Brazilian nun. It has always made it clear which side it stands on: that of marginalized groups within society and within the Church itself.

== Ecofeminism ==
She is a leader in the Latin American ecofeminist movement, writing, teaching, and organizing, including work with the Con-spirando collective in Santiago, Chile. Her ecofeminist theology focuses on the concerns and needs of the poor. For years, Ivone Gebara, in addition to being a philosopher and economic theologian from Brazil, has accompanied a truly committed woman who practices her theology to denounce the patriarchal structures of a predominantly male discourse and the unjust societal system in particular within the Church by connecting them to ecology. The ecofeminist ethic is a central theme of many of her books. She defines ecofeminism as an ideology that takes an integrating view of all the phenomena of life, both when it considers each human being and when it plans to reflect on the world (“Dictionary of Feminist Theologies”). Today, Gebara lives in a poor neighborhood, among the women, children and men of a village in the northeast of Brazil, near Recife, a way of life that animates her experiences and her writings.

== Works ==
Gebara is the author of over thirty books and numerous articles published in Portuguese, Spanish, French, English and German. Her English works are:

- Gebara, Ivone (1999). Longing for Running Water: Ecofeminism and Liberation. Fortress Press. ISBN 978-1-4514-0990-1.
- Gebara, Ivone (2002). Out of the Depths: Women's Experience of Evil and Salvation. Fortress Press. ISBN 978-1-4514-0991-8.
- Gebara, Ivone (2004). Mary, Mother of God, Mother of the Poor. Wipf & Stock Publishers. ISBN 978-1-59244-975-0.

Her major works in other languages include:

- Trindade: palavra sobre coisas velhas e novas. Uma perspectiva ecofeminista (1994)
- Teologia ecofeminista. Ensaio para repensar o Conhecimento e a Religião (1997)
- Rompendo o silêncio. Uma fenomenologia feminista do Mal (2000)
- A Mobilidade da Senzala Feminina. Mulheres Nordestinas, Vida Melhor e Feminismo (2000)
- La sed de sentido. Búsquedas ecofeministas en prosa poética (2002)
- As águas do meu poço. Reflexões sobre experiências de liberdade (2005)
- O que é Teologia (2006)
- O que é Teologia Feminista (2007)
- O que é Cristianismo (2008)
- Compartilhar os pães e os peixes. O cristianismo, a teologia e teologia feminista (2008)
- Vulnerabilidade, Justiça e e Feminismos - Antologia de Textos (2010)
- Terra - Eco Sagrado (Teologia da Libertação e Educação Popular) (with Arno Kayser)
