= Gaianism =

Earth-centered philosophical, holistic, and spiritual belief

Gaianism is an earth-centered philosophical, holistic, and spiritual belief that shares expressions with earth religions and paganism while not identifying exclusively with any specific one. The term describes a philosophy and ethical worldview which, though not necessarily religious, implies a transpersonal devotion to earth as a superorganism. Practitioners of Gaianism are called Gaians (or Gaianists).

Marcel Wissenburg has described Gaianism as a "modern variant of philosophical determinism". Gaianism has been associated with the New Age movement due to sharing similar viewpoints, but is not typically identified as strictly part of the New Age movement as a whole.

Gaianism's philosophy stems from James Lovelock's Gaia hypothesis, which proposes that organisms interact with their surroundings on Earth to form a more complex and self-regulating system that contributes to maintaining the conditions for life on the planet. Gaia can be understood as a superorganism made of organisms, as multicellular life can be understood as a superorganism at a smaller level of scale.

Practitioners of Gaianism are termed "Gaians", or sometimes "Gaianists". Followers typically approach the philosophy with the perspective that people should honor the Earth, reduce or soften their human impact on the earth, and respect all life on earth. The latter perspective is extended to all forms of life such as plant, animal, or human, and followers will often try to maintain a close relationship with the planet in order to strive toward world peace, maintain global homeostasis and find inner fulfillment. Gaians will occasionally follow Gaianism along with other religions, but for many Gaianism is not necessarily religious.

An example of Gaian philosophy is the Gaian Oath, envisioned by Lucian Tarnowski, founder of the United Planet:

We are a United Planet

I am Gaian

On my honour, I commit to a thriving civilisation in harmony with all life.

Although Gaianism is an Earth-centered belief system, it does not always align with environmental goals. For instance, the chief scientific originator of Gaianism, James Lovelock, advocated a vast expansion of nuclear energy power plants on Earth, the colonization of other planets, and a tolerance of various earthly chemical pollutants.

== See also ==
- Anima Mundi
- Gaia philosophy
