= Nature worship =

Worship of nature spirits

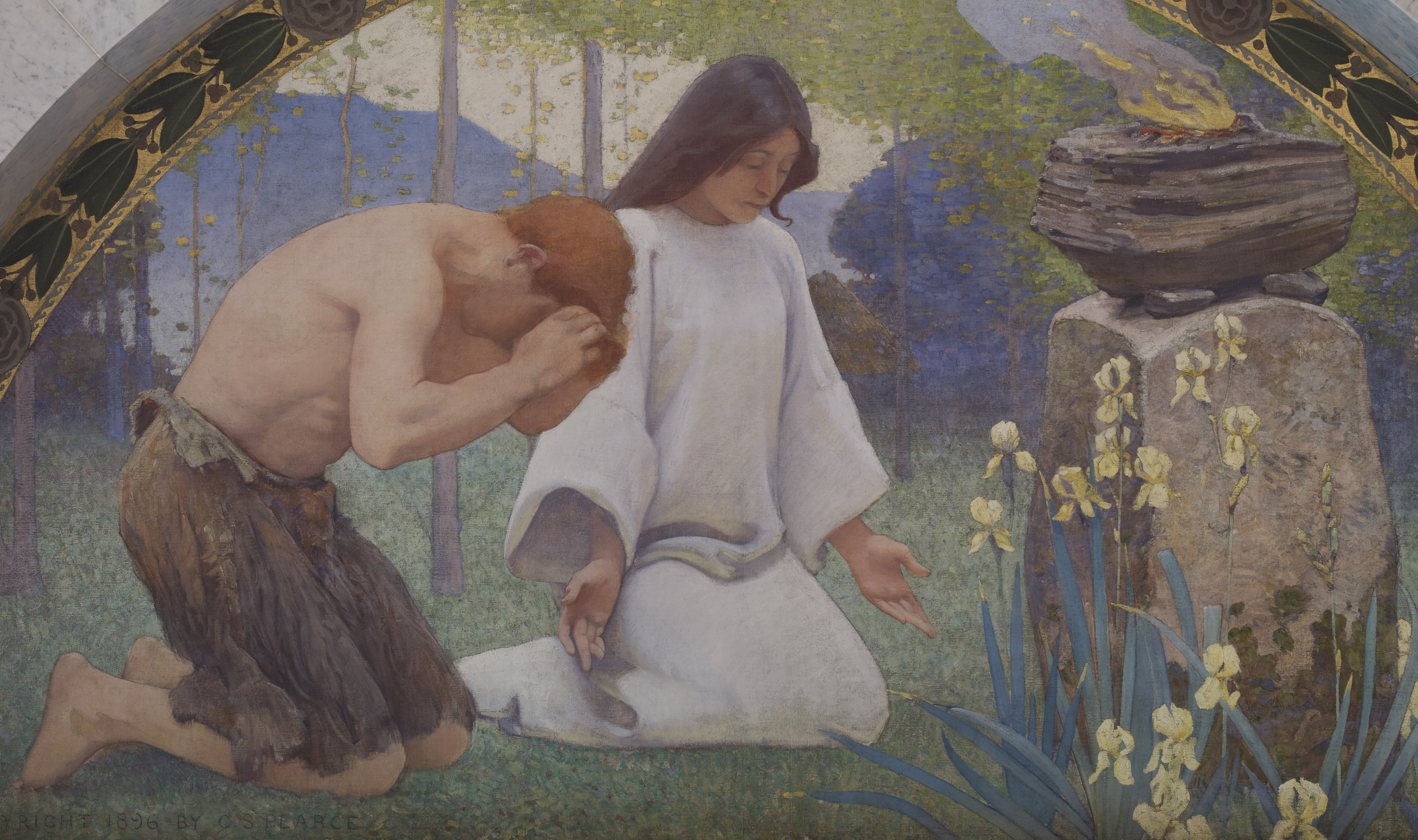
Detail from Religion by Charles Sprague Pearce depicting nature worship (1896)

Nature worship, also called naturism or physiolatry, is any of a variety of religious, spiritual, and devotional practices that focus on the worship of a nature deity, considered to be behind the natural phenomena visible throughout nature. A nature deity can be in charge of nature, a place, a biotope, the biosphere, the cosmos, or the universe. Nature worship is often considered the primitive source of modern religious beliefs and can be found in animism, pantheism, panentheism, polytheism, deism, totemism, shamanism, Taoism, Hinduism, some forms of classical theism, and paganism, including Wicca. Common to most forms of nature worship is a spiritual focus on the individual's connection and influence on some aspects of the natural world and reverence towards it. Due to their admiration of nature, the works of Edmund Spenser, Anthony Ashley-Cooper and Carl Linnaeus were viewed as nature worship.

== In the Western world ==
=== Paganism in Europe ===
In ancient European paganism, the deification of natural forces was central to religious life. The Celts and Germanic tribes believed that gods and spirits resided in natural elements such as trees, rivers, and mountains. For example, Thor was associated with thunder, and his hammer, Mjolnir, was believed to control storms and lightning. Similarly, the goddess Nerthus was linked to fertility and the earth, with rituals involving plowing sacred fields to ensure a bountiful harvest.

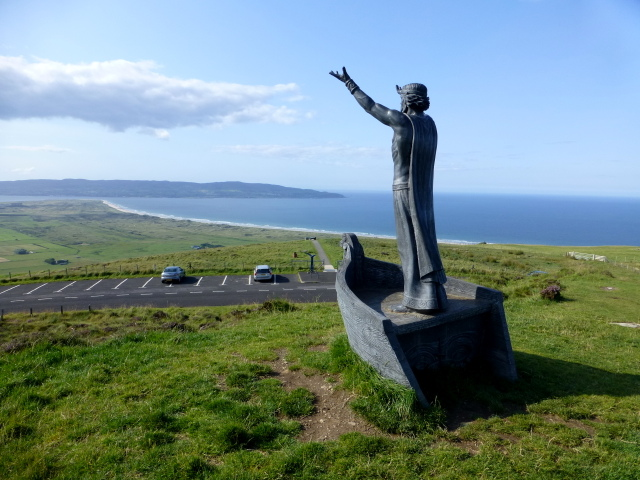
Manannán mac Lir, the Celtic sea god, sculpture by John Sutton at Gortmore

The reverence for these deified natural forces was expressed through various rituals, including food offerings, sacrifices, and festivals. Sacred groves were considered the dwelling places of these deities, and entering such spaces was often restricted to priests or those performing rituals.

=== Ancient Greece ===
In ancient Greece, many natural forces were personified and worshipped as gods and goddesses. For example, Poseidon was the god of the sea, controlling storms, earthquakes, and horses. Demeter, the goddess of agriculture, was believed to be responsible for the fertility of the earth and the changing seasons. Rituals dedicated to these deities often included offerings, sacrifices, and festivals like the Eleusinian Mysteries, which celebrated the cyclical nature of life, death, and rebirth in alignment with the agricultural calendar.

The deification of natural forces in Greek religion reflects the deep connection between humans and the environment, where natural phenomena were seen as manifestations of divine power that needed to be respected and honored through ritual practices.

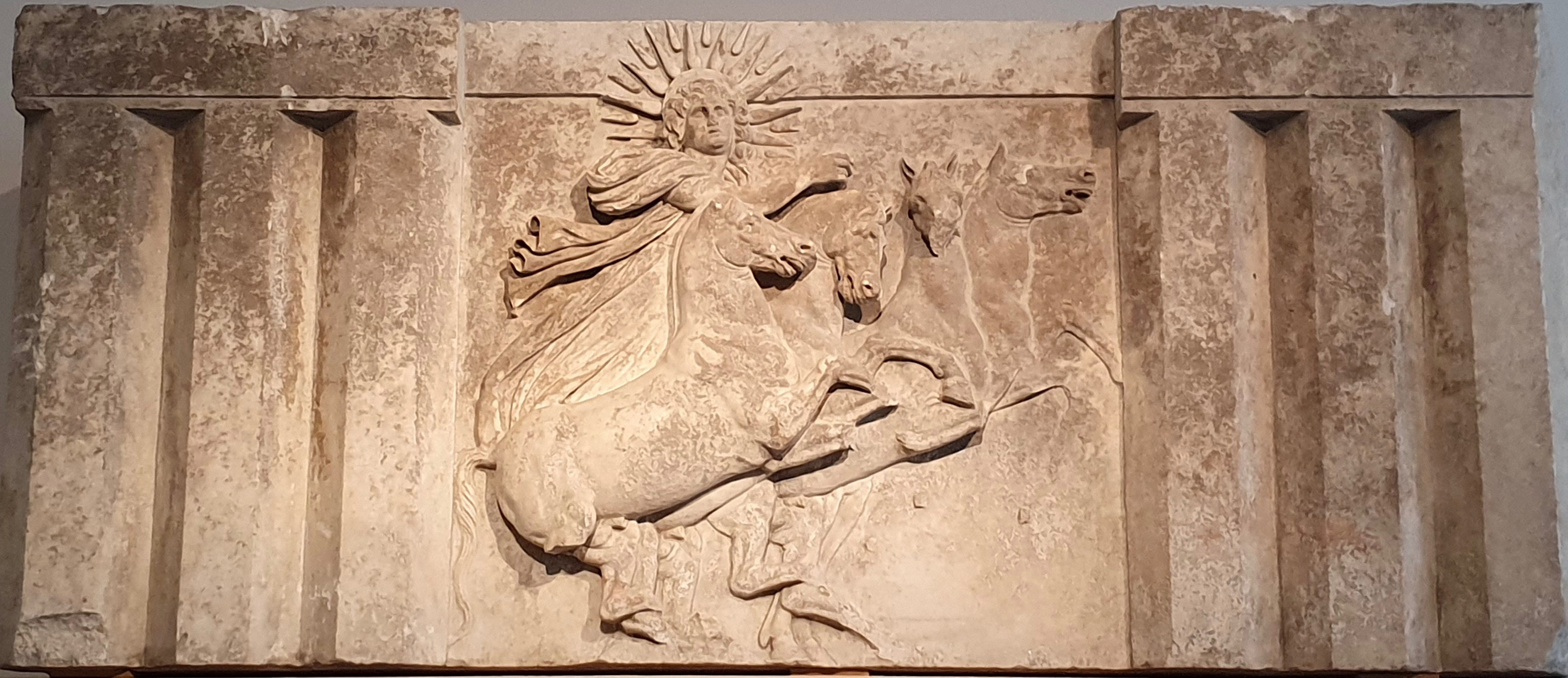
Sun god Helios in Altes Museum, an example of heliolatry

=== Native American traditions ===
Among Native American tribes, natural forces were often deified and revered as powerful spiritual beings. The Great Spirit, a central figure in many Native American belief systems, was considered the creator and sustainer of all life, with control over the natural world. Specific tribes also worshipped particular natural forces, such as the Iroquois' reverence for Thunder Beings, who were believed to bring rain and fertility to the land.

Rituals to honor these deities included dances, songs, and offerings. The Sun Dance, practiced by several Plains tribes, was a key ritual that involved fasting, dancing, and other ceremonies to seek the favor of the sun, considered a powerful life-giving force.

== In the Eastern world ==
=== Buddhism ===
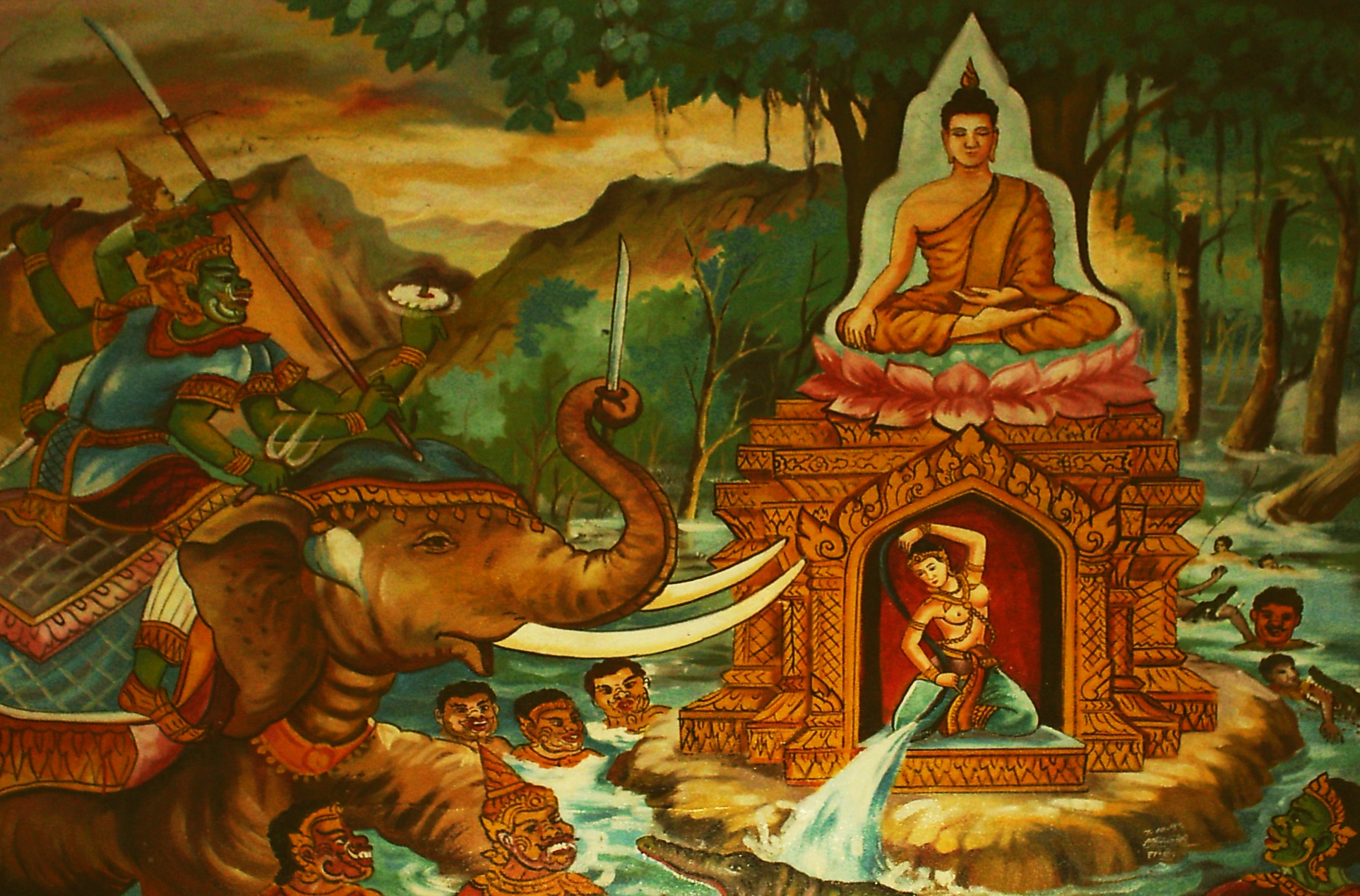
The Buddha during the battle with Mara pointing towards the earth, summoning Phra Mae Thorani to come to his assistance

In Buddhism, nature worship is reflected in the reverence for sacred earth and trees, such as Mother Earth Goddess, Phra Mae Thorani in Thai and the Bodhi tree, under which the Buddha attained Enlightenment.

In many temple murals, Phra Mae Thorani is often depicted with the Buddha in the mudra known as calling the earth to witness. The waters flowing forth from her long hair wash away the armies of Mara and symbolize the water of the Buddha's perfection of generosity (dāna paramī).

=== Hinduism ===
In Hinduism, the deification of natural forces is evident in the worship of gods and goddesses associated with various elements of nature. Agni, the god of fire, is one of the most ancient and revered deities, representing the vital force of life and the medium through which offerings are made to other gods. Indra, the god of rain and thunderstorms, is another example of a natural force personified as a deity, with rituals performed to invoke his blessings for rainfall and agricultural prosperity.

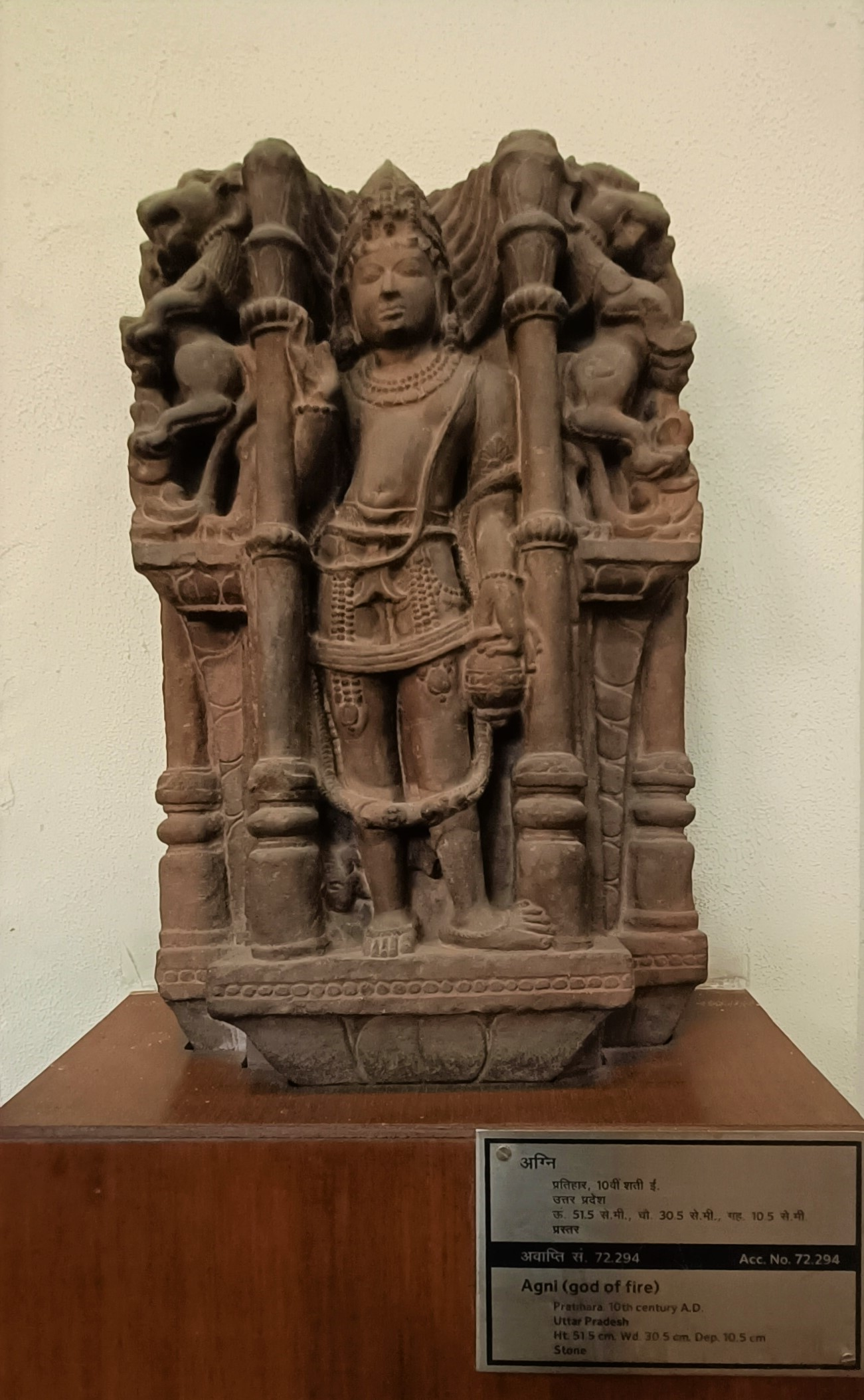
Agni, Hindu God of Fire, Stone statue from Pratihara,10th Century, A.D., Uttar Pradesh. Presently kept at the National Museum of India, India

The concept of Prakriti, or nature, in Hindu philosophy further emphasizes the divine nature of the natural world. Rituals often involve offerings to rivers, trees, and mountains, which are seen as embodiments of the divine feminine energy, or Shakti.

=== Shintoism in Japan ===
Shinto, the indigenous religion of Japan, is fundamentally a form of nature worship where natural forces are deified as kami (spirits). The sun goddess Amaterasu is the most revered kami in Shinto, symbolizing life, growth, and the continuity of the Japanese nation. Mountains like Mount Fuji are also considered sacred, believed to be the dwelling places of powerful kami.

Shinto rituals often involve purification rites, offerings of food and sake, and festivals like Matsuri that celebrate the natural forces and ensure their continued favor.

=== Taoism and Chinese folk religion ===
Taoism, with its focus on harmony with the Tao (the natural way), venerates natural landscapes and elements as expressions of the divine. Laozi, the founder of Taoism, taught that the natural world and its forces should be revered as manifestations of the Tao, leading to the deification of mountains, rivers, and other natural elements.

The shrine of Dongyue Dadi

Emperor Dongyue (or Chinese: 東嶽大帝) is the deity of sacred mountain Mount Tai in China.

== Criticism ==
English historian, Ronald Hutton, has been critical of the antiquity of Nature Worship since at least 1998 until the present. He has argued that the gods of Ancient Mediterranean were not Nature Deities of any sort; rather, they were gods of "civilization and human activity," meanwhile the "Earth-Mother goddesses" are characterized by him as mere literary figures as opposed to deities, because he believes they lack any temples dedicated to them or a priesthood to serve them. He strongly juxtaposes this view by differentiating ancient pagans from Neopagans and Wiccans who profess to be nature worshippers as an essential component of their faith, which he believes is unlike any other in recorded history. Despite having been charged by New Zealand Wiccan, Ben Whitmore, with having disenfranchised those Neopagans "who feel kinship and connection" with the gods and pagans of the Ancient World, Prof. Hutton has reprised these views, virtually verbatim, in the second edition of his book, Triumph of the Moon.

== Forms and aspects of nature worship ==
- Animal worship – Glorification of animal deities
- Fire worship – Worship or deification of fire
- Gaia philosophy – Broadly inclusive term
- Gavari – 40-day long festival held in the Mewar region of Rajasthan, India
- Green Man – Architectural motif
- Heliolatry – Sky deity who represents the Sun
- Holy well – Well or spring revered in a religious context
- Megalith – Large stone used to build a structure or monument
- Mountain worship – Faiths which regard mountains as objects of worship
- Naturalistic pantheism – Form of pantheism
- Naturalistic spirituality – Combined philosophy of spirituality and naturalism
- Sacred groves – Grove of trees of special religious importance to a particular culture
- Sacred herbs – Herbs considered sacred in some religions
- Sacred mountains – Mountains central to certain religions
- Selenolatry – Deity that represents the Moon
- Sky deity – Deity associated with the sky
- Standing stone – Large upright stone placed by humans
- Star worship – Worship of stars and other heavenly bodies as deities
- Stone circle – Ring of standing stones
- Thunder god
- Totem – Emblem of a group of people
- Tree worship – Significance of trees in religion and folklore
- Water deity

== See also ==
- Ecospirituality – Spirituality expressed through ecology and environmental activism
- Earth religion – Religion venerating the Earth and nature
- Hinduism – Range of Indian religious traditions
- Faunus – Roman deity of the countryside
- Folk religion – Expressions of religion distinct from the doctrines of organized religion
- Goddess worship (disambiguation)
- Natural religion – Concept in religious anthropology
- Neopaganism – Religions shaped by historical paganism
- Pan (god) – Ancient Greek god of the wilds, shepherds, and flocks
- Pantheism – Belief that God and reality are identical
- Panentheism – Belief that the divine pervades all of space and time and also extends beyond it
- Shamanism – Religious practice
- Taoism – Traditionally Chinese religious and philosophical tradition
- White magic – Magic used for selfless purposes
- Wildlife totemization – Emblem of a group of people
