= Qualia Fest =

Music Festival

Qualia Fest is a music festival founded by philosopher Richard Brown where various bands composed of philosophers of mind and neuroscientists perform music about consciousness and qualia.

Among the prominent scientists who have performed at Qualia Fest are David Chalmers and his Zombie Blues band, and The Amygdaloids, which is composed of Joseph E. LeDoux, Tyler Volk, Daniela Schiller, and Nina Curley. Other bands, who performed at Qualia Fest are The Whims, Quiet Karate Reflex, and The Space Clamps.
