= Tim Lenton =

Professor of Climate Change and Earth System Science

- Born: July 1973 (age 53)
- Education: Robinson College, Cambridge; University of East Anglia (PhD)
- Scientific career
- Workplaces: University of Exeter; University of East Anglia
- Thesis: Redfields green ocean : a geophysical model of marine nitrate, phosphate and atmospheric oxygen regulation (1998)
- Doctoral advisor: Andrew Watson

Timothy Michael Lenton OBE FGS FLS FRSB (born July 1973) is Professor of Climate Change and Earth System Science at the University of Exeter. He was awarded a Royal Society Wolfson Research Merit Award in 2013.

== Background ==
He graduated with a first-class degree in natural sciences from Robinson College, Cambridge in 1994 and completed his PhD under Andrew Watson at the University of East Anglia in 1998.

== Gaia hypothesis ==
Lenton has taken an interest in the Gaia hypothesis for much of his career. Early in his career, in the journal Nature, Lenton addressed a concern that the Gaia hypothesis was incompatible with the theory of natural selection by demonstrating that a model based on Daisyworld was strengthened by incorporating natural selection. In the same year, Lenton co-authored the paper "Spora and Gaia" with W. D. Hamilton, proposing that marine algae's tendency to release dimethyl sulfide, which in turn acts as a chemical precursor for cloud condensation nuclei, is an adaptive trait, as the algae can use the clouds to disperse themselves around the world. Lenton, with Andy Watson, co-authored the book Revolutions that Made the Earth; it expands on the ideas of James Lovelock on the Gaia hypothesis, by highlighting mechanisms by which the Earth system has been stabilised by negative feedbacks throughout Earth history.

== Climate change ==
=== Impacts ===
Lenton has participated in studies of possible population displacement due to climate change.

=== Tipping points ===
Lenton has been called 'a leading tipping point expert'.

Lenton was awarded the OBE in the 2025 Birthday Honours, for services to understanding climate tipping points.

== Publications ==
- Lenton, T. M.; Marsh, R.; Price, A. R.; Lunt, D. J.; Aksenov, Y.; Annan, J. D.; Cooper-Chadwick, T.; Cox, S. J.; Edwards, N. R.; Goswami, S.; Hargreaves, J. C.; Harris, P. P.; Jiao, Z.; Livina, V. N.; Payne, A. J.; Rutt, I. C.; Shepherd, J. G.; Valdes, P. J.; Williams, G.; Williamson, M. S.; Yool, A. (2007). "Effects of atmospheric dynamics and ocean resolution on bi-stability of the thermohaline circulation examined using the Grid ENabled Integrated Earth system modelling (GENIE) framework" (PDF). Climate Dynamics. 29 (6): 591. Bibcode:2007ClDy...29..591L. doi:10.1007/s00382-007-0254-9. S2CID 12716899.
- Goldblatt, C.; Lenton, T.; Watson, A. (2006). "Bistability of atmospheric oxygen and the Great Oxidation". Nature. 443 (7112): 683–686. Bibcode:2006Natur.443..683G. doi:10.1038/nature05169. PMID 17036001. S2CID 4425486.
- Lenton, T. M.; Williamson, M. S.; Edwards, N. R.; Marsh, R.; Price, A. R.; Ridgwell, A. J.; Shepherd, J. G.; Cox, S. J.; The GENIE team (2006). "Millennial timescale carbon cycle and climate change in an efficient Earth system model" (PDF). Climate Dynamics. 26 (7–8): 687–711. Bibcode:2006ClDy...26..687L. doi:10.1007/s00382-006-0109-9. S2CID 6607417.
- Lenton, T. M.; Watson, A. J. (2004). "Biotic enhancement of weathering, atmospheric oxygen and carbon dioxide in the Neoproterozoic". Geophysical Research Letters. 31 (5): L05202. Bibcode:2004GeoRL..31.5202L. doi:10.1029/2003GL018802.
- Lenton, T. M. (2000). "Land and ocean carbon cycle feedback effects on global warming in a simple Earth system model". Tellus B. 52 (5): 1159–1188. Bibcode:2000TellB..52.1159L. doi:10.1034/j.1600-0889.2000.01104.x.
- Lenton, T. M. (1998). "Gaia and natural selection". Nature. 394 (6692): 439–447. Bibcode:1998Natur.394..439L. doi:10.1038/28792. PMID 9697767. S2CID 4412683.
