= Gaia philosophy =

Broadly inclusive term

Gaia philosophy (named after Gaia, the Greek goddess of the Earth) is a broadly inclusive term for relating concepts about humanity as an effect of the life of this planet.

The Gaia hypothesis holds that all organisms on a life-giving planet regulate the biosphere in such a way as to promote its habitability. Gaia concepts draw a connection between the survivability of a species (hence its evolutionary course) and its usefulness to the survival of other species. While there were a number of precursors to the Gaia hypothesis, the first scientific form of this idea was proposed as the Gaia hypothesis by James Lovelock, a UK chemist, in 1970. The Gaia hypothesis deals with the concept of biological homeostasis, and claims the resident life forms of a host planet, coupled with their environment have acted and act like a single, self-regulating system. This system includes the near-surface rocks, the soil, and the atmosphere. These theories are, however, significant in green politics.

== Predecessors to the Gaia theory ==
There are some mystical, scientific, and religious predecessors to the Gaia philosophy, which had a Gaia-like conceptual basis. Many religious mythologies have a view of Earth as being a whole that is greater than the sum of its parts (e.g. , some Native American religions and various forms of shamanism).

Isaac Newton wrote of the earth, "Thus this Earth resembles a great animal or rather inanimate vegetable, draws in æthereall breath for its dayly refreshment & vitall ferment & transpires again with gross exhalations, And according to the condition of all other things living ought to have its times of beginning youth old age & perishing."

Pierre Teilhard de Chardin, a paleontologist and geologist, believed that evolution fractally unfolded from cell to organism to planet to solar system and ultimately the whole universe, as we humans see it from our limited perspective. Teilhard later influenced Thomas Berry and many Catholic humanist thinkers of the 20th century.

Lewis Thomas believed that Earth should be viewed as a single cell; he derived this view from Johannes Kepler's view of Earth as a single round organism.

Buckminster Fuller is generally credited with making the idea respectable in Western scientific circles in the 20th century. Building to some degree on his observations and artifacts, e.g. , the Dymaxion map of the Earth he created, others began to ask if there was a way to make the Gaia theory scientifically sound.

In 1931, L.G.M. Baas Becking delivered an inaugural lecture about Gaia in the sense of life and earth.

Oberon Zell-Ravenheart in 1970, in an article in Green Egg Magazine, independently articulated the Gaia Thesis.

== Range of views ==
According to James Kirchner, there is a spectrum of Gaia hypotheses, ranging from the undeniable to radical. At one end is the undeniable statement that the organisms on the Earth have radically altered its composition. A stronger position is that the Earth's biosphere effectively acts as if it is a self-organizing system that works in such a way as to keep its systems in some kind of equilibrium that is conducive to life. By the 2010s, the scientific consensus was that such a view (and any stronger views) is unlikely to be correct. An even stronger claim is that all lifeforms are part of a single planetary being, called Gaia. In this view, the atmosphere, the seas, and the terrestrial crust would be the result of interventions carried out by Gaia, through the coevolving diversity of living organisms.

The most extreme form of Gaia theory is that the entire Earth is a single unified organism with a highly intelligent mind that arose as an emergent property of the whole biosphere. In this view, the Earth's biosphere is consciously manipulating the climate in order to make conditions more conducive to life. Scientists contend that there is no evidence at all to support this last point of view, and it has come about because many people do not understand the concept of homeostasis.

The more speculative versions of Gaia, including versions in which it is believed that the Earth is actually conscious, sentient, and highly intelligent, are outside the bounds of what is usually considered science.

== Gaia in biology and science ==
Buckminster Fuller has been credited as the first to incorporate scientific ideas into a Gaia theory, which he did with his Dymaxion map of the Earth.

The first scientifically rigorous theory was the Gaia hypothesis by James Lovelock, a UK chemist.

A variant of this hypothesis was developed by Lynn Margulis, a microbiologist, in 1979. Her version is sometimes called the "Gaia Theory" (note uppercase-T). Her model is more limited in scope than the one that Lovelock proposed.

Whether this sort of system is present on Earth is still open to debate. Some relatively simple homeostatic mechanisms are generally accepted. For example, when atmospheric carbon dioxide levels rise, plants are able to grow better and thus remove more carbon dioxide from the atmosphere. Other biological effects and feedbacks exist, but the extent to which these mechanisms have stabilized and modified the Earth's overall climate is largely not known.

The Gaia hypothesis is sometimes viewed from significantly different philosophical perspectives. Some environmentalists view it as an almost conscious process, in which the Earth's ecosystem is literally viewed as a single unified organism. Some evolutionary biologists, on the other hand, view it as an undirected emergent property of the ecosystem: as each individual species pursues its own self-interest, its combined actions tend to have counterbalancing effects on environmental change. Proponents of this view sometimes point to examples of life's actions in the past that have resulted in dramatic change rather than stable equilibrium, such as the conversion of the Earth's atmosphere from a reducing environment to an oxygen-rich one.

== Gaia in the social sciences and politics ==
A social science view of Gaia theory is the role of humans as a keystone species that may be able to accomplish global homeostasis. Whilst a few social scientists who draw inspiration from 'organic' views of society have embraced Gaia philosophy as a way to explain the human-nature interconnections, most professional social scientists are more involved in reflecting upon the way Gaia philosophy is used and engaged with within sub-sections of society. Alan Marshall, in the Department of Social Sciences at Mahidol University, for example, reflects upon the way Gaia philosophy has been used and advocated in various societal settings by environmentalists, spiritualists, managers, economists, and scientists and engineers. As Marshall explains, most social scientists had already given up on systems ideas of society in the 1960s before Gaia philosophy was born under James Lovelock's ideas, since such ideas were interpreted as supporting conservatism and traditionalism. Gaia theory also influenced the dynamics of green politics.

== Gaia in religion ==
Rosemary Radford Ruether, the American feminist scholar and theologian, wrote a book called Gaia and God: An Ecofeminist Theology of Earth Healing.

A book edited by Allan Hunt Badiner called Dharma Gaia explores the ground where Buddhism and ecology meet through writings by the Dalai Lama, Gary Snyder, Thich Nhat Hanh, Allen Ginsberg, David Abram, Joanna Macy, Robert Aitken, and 25 other Buddhists and ecologists.

Gaianism, an earth-centered philosophical, holistic, and spiritual belief that shares expressions with earth religions and paganism while not identifying exclusively with any specific religion, sprang from the Gaia hypothesis.

== Criticism ==
One of the most problematic issues with referring to Gaia as an organism is its apparent failure to meet the biological criterion of being able to reproduce. Richard Dawkins has asserted that the planet is not the offspring of any parents and is unable to reproduce. To this criticism, Carlos de Castro gives a double response in his Organic Gaia Theory: first, that we also consider 'living beings' many that cannot reproduce either, like human babies, infertile adults, and elderly women, ant workers, or the last dodo; second, that according to the Panspermia hypothesis, Gaia could still reproduce.

== See also ==
- Arcology
- Climate engineering
- Environmental philosophy
- Gaia (mythology)
- Gaia hypothesis (James Lovelock's ideas)
- Gaianism
- Gardening
- James Kirchner
- Guy Murchie
- Keystone species
- Odic force
- Pachamama
- Places to intervene in a system
- Pantheism
- Technogaianism
- Teleology
- Urban ecology
- Steven M. Greer - Categorises entire planets to be individual conscious organisms
- Superorganism
- Edward Goldsmith

== Books on Gaia ==
- Michael S. Northcott (2022), God And Gaia: Science, Religion And Ethics On A Living Planet
- Carlos de Castro (2020), El origen de Gaia. Una teoría holista de la evolución (revised ed.) (in Spanish)
- Carlos de Castro (2019), Reencontrando a Gaia. A hombros de James Lovelock y Lynn Margulis (in Spanish)
- Toby Tyrrell (2013), On Gaia: A Critical Investigation of the Relationship between Life and Earth
- Anne Primavesi (2008), Gaia and Climate Change: A Theology of Gift Events
- Mary Midgley (2007), Earthy realism: the meaning of Gaia
- Pepper Lewis (2005), Gaia Speaks
- Stephen Henry Schneider (2004), Scientists debate gaia: the next century
- Tyler Volk (2003), Gaia's Body: Toward a Physiology of Earth
- Anne Primavesi (2003), Gaia's gift: earth, ourselves, and God after Copernicus
- Alan Marshall (2002), The Unity of Nature, Imperial College Press.
- Francesca Ciancimino Howell (2002), Making Magic with Gaia: Practices to Heal Ourselves and Our Planet
- Mary Midgley (2001), Gaia: the next big idea
- Anne Primavesi (2000), Sacred Gaia: holistic theology and earth system science
- George Ronald Williams (1996), The molecular biology of Gaia
- Peter Bunyard (1996), Gaia in Action: Science of the Living Earth
- Norman Myers (1993), Gaia An Atlas of Planet Management
- Lawrence E. Joseph (1991), Gaia: the growth of an idea
- Rosemary Radford Ruether (1992), Gaia & God: An Ecofeminist Theology of Earth Healing
- Allan Hunt Badiner (1990), Dharma Gaia: A Harvest of Essays in Buddhism and Ecology
