= Daisyworld =

1983 simulation of a simple planetary ecosystem

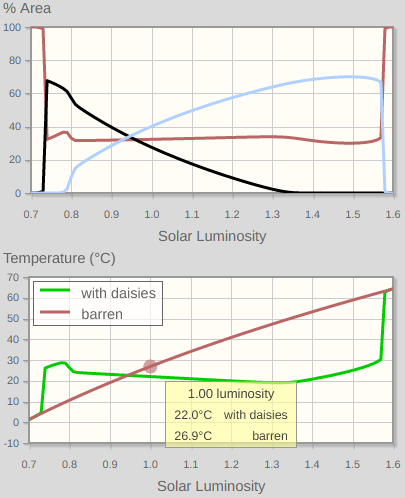
Plots from a standard DaisyWorld simulation. Note, these plots are not from, nor do they correspond directly to, any data figure presented in the studies cited herein.

Daisyworld is a hypothetical planet and computer model developed by James Lovelock and Andrew Watson to illustrate how physically realistic feedback between life and its environment can give rise to planetary self-regulation without foresight or planning by the organisms themselves. The model was originally developed in response to early criticism of the Gaia hypothesis and has become a widely used conceptual model in ecology, Earth system science, and studies of geosphere–biosphere interactions.

In its original form, Daisyworld consists of a fictional planet populated only by black and white daisies, whose contrasting albedos respectively warm and cool the planet. As the luminosity of the planet's star changes, competition between the two daisy populations alters the planet's overall reflectivity, producing negative feedback that maintains surface temperatures near an optimum for daisy growth over a broad range of solar luminosities.

Daisyworld has been used extensively as a simplified model for investigating the biological regulation of planetary environments and the emergence of ecological feedbacks. Later versions introduced additional species, trophic interactions, habitat fragmentation, and biogeochemical processes to explore the robustness of self-regulation under more complex conditions. The model has also attracted criticism because its self-regulating behaviour depends in part on simplifying assumptions of the original model and because it omits many features of the Earth system.

== Synopsis, 1983 simulation ==
Wood and colleagues, in a 2008 review citing the two 1983 Lovelock primary research papers on Daisyworld (still Daisy World or the same in lower case, at that point), describe it as being formulated in response to early criticism of Lovelock's Gaia hypothesis, specifically, being a model "invented to demonstrate that planetary self-regulation can emerge automatically from physically realistic feedback between life and its environment, without any need for foresight or planning on the part of the organisms",

Given the impossibility of fully representing the "coupling" of the whole of the Earth's biota and its environment, the hypothetical model

is an imaginary grey world orbiting, at a similar distance to the Earth, a star like our Sun that gets brighter with time. The environment... is reduced to one variable, temperature, and the biota consist of two types of life, black and white daisies, which share the same optimum temperature for growth and limits to growth. The soil of Daisyworld is sufficiently well watered and laden with nutrients for temperature alone to determine the growth rate of the daisies. The planet has a negligible atmospheric greenhouse, so its surface temperature is simply determined by... [the hypothetical star's] luminosity and its [the planet's] overall albedo [reflective power, the fraction of incident radiation reflected by the surface], which is, in turn, influenced by the coverage of the two daisy types.

This hypothetical construction produces, in its mathematical modeling, a nonlinear system "with interesting self-regulating properties".

== Purpose and impact ==
A short video about the DaisyWorld model and its implications for real-world Earth science.

The purpose of the model is to demonstrate that feedback mechanisms can evolve from the actions or activities of self-interested organisms, rather than through classic group selection mechanisms. Daisyworld examines the energy budget of a planet populated by two different types of plants, black daisies and white daisies. The colour of the daisies influences the albedo of the planet such that black daisies absorb light and warm the planet, while white daisies reflect light and cool the planet. Competition between the daisies (based on temperature-effects on growth rates) leads to a balance of populations that tends to favour a planetary temperature close to the optimum for daisy growth.

Lovelock sought to demonstrate the stability of Daisyworld by making its sun evolve along the main sequence, taking it from low to high solar constant. This perturbation of Daisyworld's receipt of solar radiation caused the balance of daisies to gradually shift from black to white but the planetary temperature was always regulated back to this optimum (except at the extreme ends of solar evolution). This situation is very different from the corresponding abiotic world, where temperature is unregulated and rises linearly with solar output.

== Criticism ==
Daisyworld was designed to refute the idea that there was something inherently mystical about the Gaia hypothesis that Earth's surface displays homeostatic and homeorhetic properties similar to those of a living organism; specifically, thermoregulation was addressed.

Wood and colleagues noted in 2008 that a key element in the hypothetical construct of Daisyworld was that the species of focus,

"the daisies alter the same environmental variable (temperature) in the same direction at the local level and the global level. Hence what is selected for at the individual level is directly linked to its global effects. This makes the original model a special case (and it is one that is not particularly prevalent in the real world). Evolutionary biologists often criticize the original model for this reason."

The Gaia hypothesis has otherwise attracted a substantial amount of criticism from scientists, e.g., Richard Dawkins, who argued that planet-level thermoregulation was impossible without planetary natural selection, which might involve evidence of dead planets that did not thermoregulate. W. Ford Doolittle rejected the notion of planetary regulation because it seemed to require a "secret consensus" among organisms, thus some sort of inexplicable purpose on a planetary scale. Others countered the criticism that some "secret consensus" would be required for planetary regulation, suggesting that thermoregulation of a planet beneficial to the two species arises naturally.

Later criticism of Daisyworld centers on the fact that although it is often used as an analogy for Earth, the original simulation leaves out many important details of the true Earth system. For example, the hypothetical system requires an ad-hoc death rate (γ) to sustain homeostasis, and does not take into account the difference between species-level phenomena and individual level phenomena. Detractors of the simulation believed inclusion of these details would cause the system to become unstable, making it a false analogy. These criticisms were countered by Timothy Lenton and James Lovelock in 2001, who argued that including further factors can improve climate regulation on later versions of Daisyworld.

== Subsequent research ==
Later versions of Daisyworld, identifying the research area as "tutorial modelling of geosphere–biosphere interactions", introduced a range of grey daisies, as well as populations of grazers and predators, and found that these further increased the stability of the homeostasis.

More recently, other research, modeling real biochemical cycles of Earth, and using various types of organisms (e.g. photosynthesisers, decomposers, herbivores and primary and secondary carnivores) also argues to have produced Daisyworld-like regulation and stability, in support of ideas related to planetary biological diversity. This enables nutrient recycling within a regulatory framework derived by natural selection amongst species, where one being's harmful waste becomes low energy food for members of another guild. For instance, research on the Redfield ratio of nitrogen to phosphorus suggests that local biotic processes might regulate global systems.

Later extension of the Daisyworld simulations which included rabbits, foxes and other species, led to the proposal that the larger the number of species, the greater thermoregulartory improvement for the entire planet, results suggesting that such a hypothetical system was robust and stable even when perturbed. Daisyworld simulations where environments were stable gradually became less diverse over time; in contrast gentle perturbations led to bursts of species richness, lending support to the idea that biodiversity is valuable.

This finding was supported by a 1994 primary research report on species composition, dynamics, and diversity in successional and native grasslands in Minnesota by David Tilman and John A. Downing, which concluded that "primary productivity in more diverse plant communities is more resistant to, and recovers more fully from, a major drought". They go on to add that their "results support the diversity stability hypothesis but not the alternative hypothesis that most species are functionally redundant".

== Relevance to Earth ==
Because Daisyworld is so simple, having for example, no atmosphere, no animals, only one species of plant life, and only the most basic population growth and death models, it should not be directly compared to Earth. This was stated very clearly by the original authors. Even so, it provided a number of useful predictions of how Earth's biosphere may respond to, for example, human interference. Later adaptations of Daisyworld (discussed below), which added many layers of complexity, still showed the same basic trends of the original model.

One prediction of the simulation is that the biosphere works to regulate the climate, making it habitable over a wide range of solar luminosity. Many examples of these regulatory systems have been found on Earth.

== See also ==
- Gaia hypothesis
- Gaia philosophy
- SimEarth
