= Zombie Blues =

Australian rock band

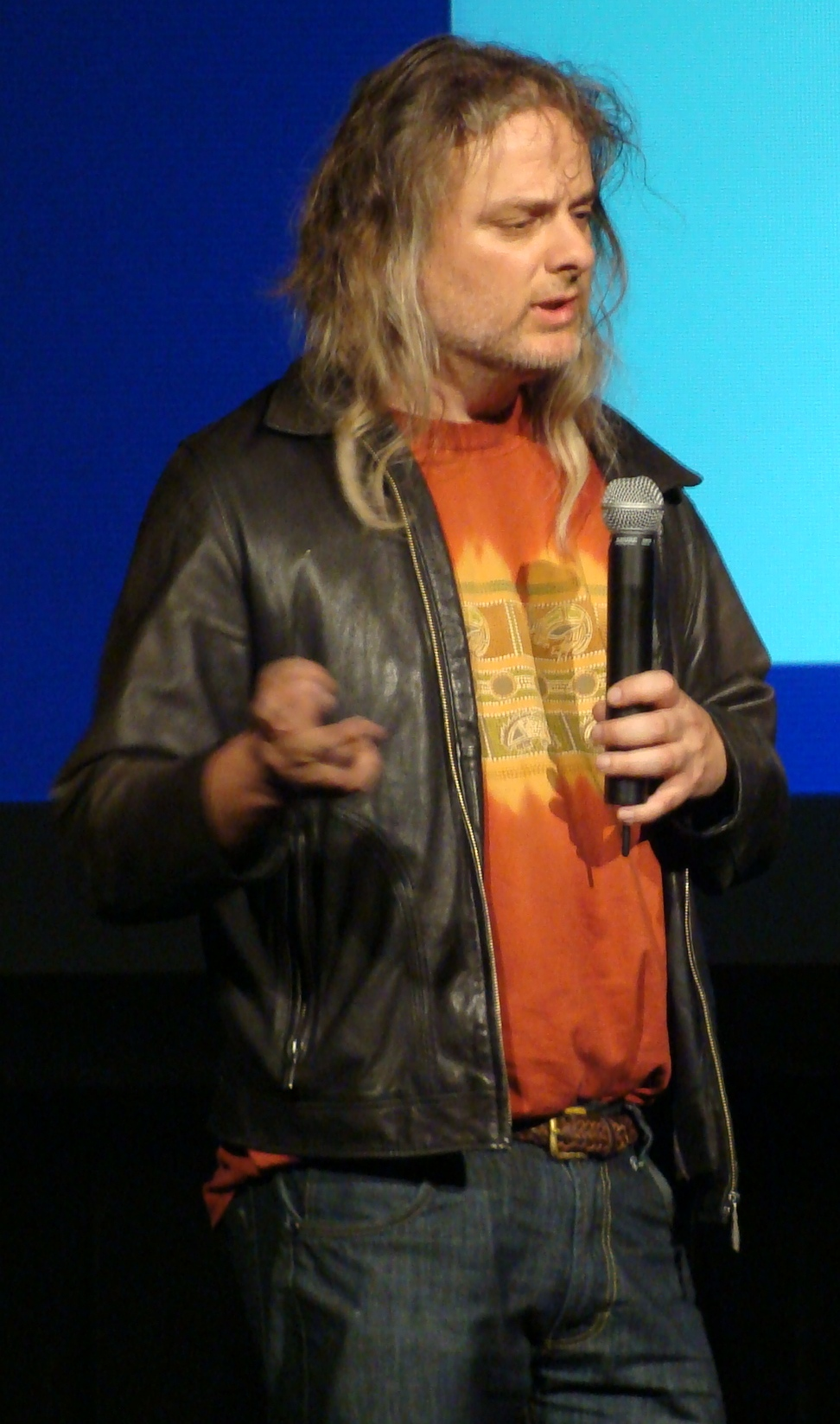
- Zombie Blues' founder and lead singer, David Chalmers in 2008

Background information
- Genres: Blues rock, rock and roll
- Members: David Chalmers

Zombie Blues is a rock band founded by the Australian philosopher and cognitive scientist David Chalmers, who serves as the lead singer of the band. Its name comes from Chalmers' philosophical zombie thought experiment—a hypothetical creature that looks like humans but lacks consciousness.

The band's only song, "The Zombie Blues", has been performed at various cognitive science and philosophy conventions, including Qualia Fest. Its core lyrics include:

I act like you act, I do what you do / But I don’t know, what it’s like to be you / What consciousness is, I ain’t got a clue / I got the zombie blues.

— David Chalmers

The Irish Times wrote, "With his leather jacket and biker’s haircut, David Chalmers is about the closest thing philosophy has to a rock star these days."
