= Metapattern =

A metapattern is a pattern of patterns.

== Definition ==
The concept of a metapattern was introduced by Gregory Bateson in the introduction to his 1979 book Mind and Nature: A Necessary Unity. "My central thesis can now be approached in words: The pattern which connects is a metapattern. It is a pattern of patterns. It is that metapattern which defines the vast generalization that, indeed, it is patterns which connect."

== Tyler Volk ==
Tyler Volk, an environmental scientist at New York University expanded on Bateson's description in his 1995 book, Metapatterns: Across Space, Time, and Mind. "To me, a metapattern is a pattern so wide-flung that it appears throughout the spectrum of reality: in clouds, rivers, and planets; in cells, organisms, and ecosystems; in art, architecture, and politics." Volk further defines metapatterns as "functional universals for forms in space, processes in time, and concepts in mind."

As Volk explains in his prologue, "I was fortunate to have studied with Bateson while he was writing Mind and Nature. It was the autumn of 1977, and he was a scholar-in-residence at the Lindisfarne Association in New York City." At that time, Volk was teaching "Visual Science" and "Patterns in Time" as science and humanities courses at the School of Visual Arts.

Volk describes ten metapatterns: Spheres, Sheets/Tubes, Borders, Binaries, Centers, Layers, Calendars, Arrows, Breaks, and Cycles. Education collaborator Jeff Bloom developed a metapatterns website exploring these themes.

== Pieter Wisse ==
The Dutch computer scientist Pieter Wisse proposed a method called Metapattern for conceptual modeling: a technique for meta-information analysis and modeling that emphasizes reusability. The method is described in his book Metapattern: Context and Time in Information Models and other papers.
