= Medea hypothesis =

Hypothesis that multicellular life may be self-destructive

The Medea hypothesis is a term coined by paleontologist Peter Ward in 2009 for a hypothesis that contests the Gaian hypothesis and proposes that multicellular life, understood as a superorganism, may be self-destructive or suicidal. The metaphor refers to the mythological Medea (representing the Earth), who kills her own children (multicellular life).

In this view, microbial-triggered mass extinctions result in returns to the microbial-dominated state Earth has been in for most of its history.

== Examples ==
Possible examples of extinction events induced entirely or partially by biotic activities include:

- The Great Oxidation Event, 2.45 billion years ago, believed to be responsible for the mass poisoning of anaerobic microbes to which oxygen was toxic, and for the Huronian glaciation that resulted from the reaction of methane with oxygen to form carbon dioxide (a less potent greenhouse gas than methane) and subsequent depletion of atmospheric carbon dioxide by aerobic photosynthesisers
- The Sturtian and Marinoan Snowball Earth glaciations, 715 to 680 and 650 to 632.3 million years ago, respectively, resulting from the sequestration of atmospheric carbon dioxide during the Neoproterozoic Oxygenation Event
- The Late Ordovician Mass Extinction (LOME), 445.2 million years ago to 443.8 million years ago, suggested by some studies to have been caused by glaciation resulting from carbon dioxide depletion driven by the radiation of land plants
- Euxinic events, such as during the Great Dying, 251.9 million years ago, and the aforementioned LOME, caused by sulfur-reducing bacteria that produce hydrogen sulfide.

The list excludes the Cretaceous–Paleogene extinction event, since this was, at least partially, externally induced by a meteor impact.

== Current status and future extinctions ==
Peter Ward proposes that the current man-made climate change and mass extinction event may be considered to be the most recent Medean event. As these events are anthropogenic, he postulates that Medean events are not necessarily caused by microbes, but by intelligent life as well and that the final mass extinction of complex life, roughly about 500–900 million years in the future, can also be considered a Medean event: "Plant life that still exists then will be forced to adapt to a warming and expanding Sun, causing them to remove even more carbon dioxide from the atmosphere (which in turn will have already been lowered due to the increasing heat from the Sun gradually speeding up the weathering process that removes these molecules from the atmosphere), and ultimately accelerating the complete extinction of complex life by making carbon dioxide levels drop down to just 10 ppm, below which plants can no longer survive." However, Ward simultaneously argues that intelligent life such as humans may not necessarily just trigger future Medean events, but may eventually prevent them from occurring.

== See also ==
- Death drive
- Fermi paradox
- Future of Earth § Climate impact
