= Andy Watson (scientist) =

British scientist

Andrew Watson
- Born: 1952 (age 73–74)
- Education: Imperial College London; University of Reading
- Scientific career
- Workplaces: University of Exeter; University of East Anglia
- Thesis: Consequences for the Biosphere of Forest and Grassland Fires (1978)
- Doctoral advisor: James Lovelock
- Doctoral students: Tim Lenton

Andrew James Watson FRS (born 1952) is a British marine and atmospheric scientist and an expert in processes affecting atmospheric carbon dioxide and oxygen concentrations. He was formerly a Professor of biogeochemistry in the School of Environmental Sciences at the University of East Anglia, in 2013 he moved to a position as Professor at the College of Life and Environmental Sciences at the University of Exeter.

== Earth sciences ==
Watson graduated with a first class BSc in physics from Imperial College London in 1975. He then became a PhD student of James Lovelock, originator of the Gaia hypothesis of Earth regulation, at the University of Reading. He and Lovelock introduced the Daisyworld model in 1983, showing how ecological competition between hypothetical "daisies" could affect planetary albedo and regulate environmental temperature. Watson and his students have subsequently developed a priori models for the regulation of atmospheric composition through geological time. He has applied the weak Anthropic Principle to evolution on Earth, suggesting that long-term regulation of the Earth’s temperature and environment may be a necessary pre-requisite to allow sufficient time for the evolution of complex life and intelligence, rather than an intrinsic property of the biosphere as Lovelock proposed.

== Tracing ocean waters ==
While at the Marine Biological Association and Plymouth Marine Laboratory in the 1980s, he developed techniques for tracking ocean water bodies using tracers such as sulphur hexafluoride and perfluorodecalin. He and colleagues applied these to measure the slow mixing vertical rates in the ocean, and to trace the movement of patches of surface water. He also applied the technology to enable iron fertilization experiments. More than a dozen such experiments have now been carried out and have proved that iron is an essential limiting nutrient in important areas of the world ocean.

== Popular science ==
Watson published the popular book Revolutions that Made the Earth with colleague Tim Lenton in 2011. In 2015, Watson appeared on Charlie Brooker's Weekly Wipe Series 3, interviewed by the character, Philomena Cunk.
