= Joseph E. LeDoux =

American neuroscientist

Joseph E. LeDoux (born December 7, 1949) is an American neuroscientist whose research is primarily focused on survival circuits, including their impacts on emotions such as fear and anxiety. He is the Henry and Lucy Moses Professor of Science at New York University, and director of the Emotional Brain Institute, a collaboration between NYU and New York State with research sites at NYU and the Nathan Kline Institute for Psychiatric Research in Orangeburg, New York. He is also the lead singer and songwriter in the band The Amygdaloids.

== Early life and education ==
Joseph LeDoux was born on December 7, 1949, in the Cajun Prairie town of Eunice, Louisiana, to Joseph E. "Boo" LeDoux, a traveling rodeo performer (bull rider) and butcher, and Priscilla Buller LeDoux. He attended St. Edmund's Elementary School and Eunice High School, graduating in 1967. LeDoux attended Louisiana State University in Baton Rouge where he majored in Business Administration and minored in Psychology. In 1972 he began work on a Masters of Science in Marketing from LSU. During this time, his interest in psychology grew and he volunteered in the laboratory of Robert Thompson, who introduced him to brain research.

With his Louisiana childhood, LeDoux was drawn to cajun/zydeco music, along with country, R&B, rock, and their fusion into "swamp pop". In high school, he was a disc jockey at the local radio station, KEUN, and the rhythm guitarist of two bands: the Deadbeats and the Countdowns.

== Academic and professional history ==
In the fall of 1974 LeDoux began a Ph.D. program at the State University of New York at Stony Brook (now known as Stony Brook University), and completed his doctorate in 1977. He was hired by the Department of Neurology at Cornell Medical School as a postdoctoral fellow and remained there through the rank of associate professor until 1989. During most of his time at Cornell, he worked in the Neurobiology Laboratory where he received technical training in state-of-the-art neuroscience techniques and began researching the brain mechanism of emotional memory that he has pursued ever since. In 1989 he joined NYU's newly formed Center for Neural Science as their first outside hire. In 1991 he was promoted to full professor, and in 1996 he became the Henry and Lucy Moses Professor of Science. In 2005, he was named "University Professor".

== Personal life ==
In 1971 LeDoux married LSU classmate Diana Steen. They divorced amicably in 1978. Since 1982 he has been married to art critic Nancy Princenthal. They reside in the Williamsburg area of Brooklyn. They have two children, Jacob S. LeDoux (died 2005) and Milo E. LeDoux. Milo is a graduate of the University of Oxford, where he studied classics, and is pursuing a career in law.

=== Musical pursuits ===
In 2004, LeDoux and NYU Biology Professor Tyler Volk began performing as a cover band for small parties around NYU, and in 2006 they formed The Amygdaloids. The original band also included Daniela Schiller, (then an NYU postdoctoral fellow), and graduate student Nina Curley. The band's lyrics, mostly written by LeDoux, are based on neuroscientific, psychological, and philosophical themes, and offer scholarly insights into the role of mind and brain in daily life. Their inaugural CD, Heavy Mental, was released in 2007. On their second CD, Theory of My Mind, LeDoux and Grammy winner Rosanne Cash sing "Crime of Passion" and "Mind over Matter", both written by LeDoux. In 2012, the band released All in Our Minds, an EP in which all songs had "mind" in their title. Anxious, a companion to LeDoux's book with the same title, was released in 2015 and explores some of the same scientific themes as the book, but through song. The band's unique focus on original songs about mind and brain has landed them considerable press. They play regularly in New York City, and have also performed in cities around the world. LeDoux and Amygdaloids' bassist Colin Dempsey perform as an acoustic duo called So We Are.

== Research and theories ==
=== Work on threat response, anxiety, and emotions ===
As explained in his 1996 book, The Emotional Brain, LeDoux developed an interest in the topic of emotion through his doctoral work with Michael Gazzaniga on split-brain patients in the mid-1970s. Because techniques for studying the human brain were limited at the time, he turned to studies of rodents where the brain could be studied in detail. He chose to focus on a simple behavioral model, Pavlovian fear conditioning. This procedure allowed him to follow the flow of information about a stimulus through the brain as it comes to control behavioral responses by way of sensory pathways to the amygdala, and gave rise to the notion of two sensory roads to the amygdala, with the "low road" being a quick and dirty subcortical pathway for rapid activity behavioral responses to threats and the "high road" providing slower but highly processed cortical information. His work has shed light on how the brain detects and responds to threats, and how memories about such experiences are formed and stored through cellular, synaptic and molecular changes in the amygdala. A long-standing collaboration with NYU colleague Elizabeth Phelps has shown the validity of the rodent work for understanding threat processing in the human brain.

LeDoux's work on amygdala processing of threats has helped understand exaggerated responses to threats in anxiety disorders in humans. For example, studies with Maria Morgan in the 1990s implicated the medial prefrontal cortex in the extinction (psychology) of responses to threats and paved the way for understanding how exposure therapy reduces threat reactions in people with anxiety by way of interactions between the medial prefrontal cortex and the amygdala. Work conducted with Karim Nader and Glenn Schafe triggered a wave of interest in the topic of memory reconsolidation, a process by which memories become labile and subject to change after being retrieved. This led to the idea that trauma-related cues might be weakened in humans by blocking reconsolidation. Studies with Marie Mofils, Daniela Schiller and Phelps showed that extinction conducted shortly after triggering reconsolidation is considerably more effective in reducing the threat value of stimuli than conventional extinction, a finding that has proven useful in reducing drug relapse in humans.

=== Difference between threat response and emotions ===
In 2012 LeDoux emphasized the value, when discussing brain functions in animals, of using terms that are not derived from human subjective experience. The common practice of calling brain circuits that detect and respond to threats "fear circuits" implies that these circuits are responsible for feelings of fear. LeDoux has argued that so-called Pavlovian fear conditioning should be renamed Pavlovian threat conditioning to avoid the implication that "fear" is being acquired in rats or humans.

In 2015 he emphasised the notion of survival functions mediated by survival circuits, the purpose of which is to keep organisms alive (rather than to make emotions). For example, defensive survival circuits exist to detect and respond to threats, and can be present in all organisms. However, only organisms that can be conscious of their own brain's activities can feel fear. Fear is a conscious experience and occurs the same way as any other kind of conscious experience: via cortical circuits that allow attention to certain forms of brain activity. He argues the only differences between an emotional and non-emotion state of consciousness are the underlying neural ingredients that contribute to the state. These ideas and their implications for understanding the neural foundations of pathological fear and anxiety are explained in his 2015 book, Anxious, where he writes: "Fear and anxiety are not biologically wired... They are the consequence of the cognitive processing of nonemotional ingredients."

In 2018 he wrote that the amygdala may release hormones due to a trigger (such as an innate reaction to seeing a snake), but "then we elaborate it through cognitive and conscious processes". He differentiated between the defence system, which has evolved over time, and emotions such as fear and anxiety. He points out that even simple organisms such as bacteria move in response to threats; "It's in the brain to allow an organism, whether it be a bacterium or a human, to detect and respond to danger. ... It's not in the brain to create feelings like fear and anxiety." Lisa Feldman Barrett takes a similar view.

== Awards and professional recognition ==
LeDoux has received a number of awards, including the Karl Spencer Lashley Award from the American Philosophical Society, the Fyssen International Prize in Cognitive Science, Jean Louis Signoret Prize of the IPSEN Foundation, the Santiago Grisolia Prize, the American Psychological Association Distinguished Scientific Contributions Award, and the American Psychological Association Donald O. Hebb Award. He is a fellow of the American Academy of Arts and Sciences, the New York Academy of Sciences, and the American Association for the Advancement of Science, a William James Fellow of the Association for Psychological Science, and a member of the National Academy of Sciences.

== Books and other public outreach ==
In addition to numerous publications in scholarly journals, LeDoux has written:

- The Integrated Mind (with Michael Gazzaniga, Plenum, 1978)
- The Emotional Brain (Simon and Schuster, 1998)
- Synaptic Self: How Our Brains Become Who We Are (Viking, 2002)
- Anxious: Using the Brain to Understand and Treat Fear and Anxiety (Viking, 2015)
- The Deep History of Ourselves: The Four-Billion-Year Story of How We Got Conscious Brains (Viking, 2019)
- The Four Realms of Existence: A New Theory of Being Human (Belknap 2023)

He has edited several volumes, including Mind and Brain: Dialogues in Cognitive Neuroscience (with William Hirst, Cambridge University Press, 1986), The Self: From Soul to Brain (with Jacek Debiec and Henry Moss, Annals of the New York Academy of Science, 2003), and Post-Traumatic Stress Disorder: Basic Science and Clinical Practice (with Peter Shiromani and Terrence Keane, Humana Press, 2009).

He has contributed to The New York Times Opinionator column on anxiety and to the Huffington Post, and has conducted numerous television, radio, online, and print interviews. LeDoux has also collaborated with filmmaker Alexis Gambis on a project called "My Mind's Eye" on the Scientific American website in which interviews with esteemed scientists and philosophers (including Eric Kandel, Michael Gazzaniga, Ned Block) are framed within the context of his music (see § Music below).
