= On Gaia: A Critical Investigation of the Relationship between Life and Earth =

2013 book by Toby Tyrrell

- Cover
- Author: Toby Tyrrell
- Language: English
- Subject: Earth science, the Gaia hypothesis
- Publisher: Princeton University Press
- Publication date: July 21, 2013
- Media type: Print (Hardcover, Paperback), eBook
- Pages: 320
- ISBN: 978-0-691-12158-1

On Gaia: A Critical Investigation of the Relationship between Life and Earth is a 2013 book by Earth system scientist Toby Tyrrell, which critically examines the Gaia hypothesis, originally proposed by James Lovelock in the 1970s. The Gaia hypothesis suggests that life on Earth actively contributes to maintaining the planet's habitability through complex interactions between living organisms and their environment. Tyrrell's book argues against the credibility of this hypothesis, drawing on evidence from a wide range of scientific disciplines including climate science, oceanography, atmospheric science, geology, ecology, and evolutionary biology. Through a detailed analysis of the interactions between life and Earth, Tyrrell concludes that the biologically mediated feedback mechanisms proposed by the Gaia hypothesis are not the main reason for Earth's past environmental stability and do not ensure protection against poor human stewardship of the planet.

== Summary ==
The Gaia hypothesis, first proposed by James Lovelock in 1972 and later developed together with biologist Lynn Margulis, suggested that life on Earth regulates the planet to maintain conditions favorable for life, even implying altruistic acts by organisms for the benefit of the global environment. Although initially attracting interest and support by some scientists, the hypothesis was largely rejected by the scientific community, with critics like Richard Dawkins arguing against it. Toby Tyrrell, an Earth system science professor, critically examined the Gaia hypothesis by addressing its three main assertions: that organisms have had a large influence on the nature of Earth's environment, that the environment is particularly well suited to life, and that Earth's environment has remained stable over time. Tyrrell found flaws in the Gaia hypothesis, particularly in the second and third assertions, and instead supported the coevolutionary hypothesis, which argues that life and the environment have influenced each other over time without implying Earth's inevitable habitability. Through ten chapters, Tyrrell studied and critiqued the Gaia hypothesis in detail.

The author systematically evaluated the key components of the Gaia hypothesis, questioning its claims that Earth has remained a favorable habitat for life due to life's role in shaping the environment. He argues that the feedback mechanisms described by Gaia do not provide sufficient protection against environmental instability and that Earth's continued habitability has been partly a result of chance (explored further in Tyrrell’s later work) rather than solely because it is a self-regulating system. The book highlights the dangers of assuming that Earth is inherently stable and self-regulating, particularly in the face of modern environmental challenges such as climate change, overpopulation, and pollution.

== Reviews ==
Scott K. Johnson highlighted the book's thorough, evidence-based analysis, though he noted that it could be challenging for readers without a background in the subject.

William H. Schlesinger viewed Tyrrell's book as a systematic and well-reasoned critique of the Gaia theory. Schlesinger appreciated Tyrrell's dispassionate examination and noted that the book effectively highlighted the flaws in the Gaia hypothesis, particularly its failure to account for the Earth's less-than-optimal conditions for life and its inability to explain the planet's climate stability over time. He also commended the book for being well-produced and easy to read. Schlesinger concluded that Tyrrell's work signified the end of the Gaia theory as a viable explanation in planetary ecology.

Wilkinson acknowledged Tyrrell's extensive analysis of the Gaia hypothesis and recognized the significance Tyrrell placed on the idea, despite ultimately concluding that the concept as a whole is incorrect. Wilkinson appreciated Tyrrell's exploration of the different interpretations of Gaia, particularly the distinction between "coevolutionary Gaia" and "homeostatic Gaia," although he disagreed with Tyrrell's view that the coevolutionary aspect should be seen as a rival theory rather than part of Gaia. Wilkinson highlighted Tyrrell's emphasis on the difficulties of defining Gaia and the skepticism from evolutionary biologists regarding the idea that life regulates the Earth's environment for its own benefit. He also noted Tyrrell's discussion of the anthropic principle, which suggests that Earth's life-supporting conditions might be a matter of luck rather than an inherent property of planets with life. While Tyrrell viewed this as undermining the idea of Gaia, Wilkinson argued that the Earth system still operates in a way that is effectively Gaian, whether through luck or as an emergent property.

In his review, Michael Ruse questioned the necessity of writing the book, as it merely confirms what is already widely accepted. Ruse also suggested that Tyrrell could have focused on the positive aspects of what is known about Earth and its systems or explored the impact of Lovelock and Margulis's work. Ruse also highlighted the ongoing public enthusiasm for the Gaia hypothesis despite its scientific rejection, wondering why there is a disconnect between public and scientific opinion and suggesting this might be a broader issue beyond just the Gaia hypothesis.

Sara L. Crosby found the book to be an effective, thorough, and even-handed critique of the Gaia hypothesis. She acknowledged that Tyrrell's work was meticulously researched, presenting a detailed examination of the scientific evidence both for and against the Gaia hypothesis. Crosby appreciated Tyrrell's methodical breakdown of the hypothesis into testable components and his use of new climate data to challenge the idea that life has played a significant role in maintaining Earth's habitability over geological time. Tyrrell's focus on debunking Gaia and replacing it with a more pessimistic view of Earth's fragility struck Crosby as potentially disheartening, though she understood his motivation to encourage a deeper and more accurate understanding of how the environment works.

The Dutch biologist and blogger Leon Vlieger appreciated how Tyrrell systematically evaluated the scientific evidence for and against the Gaia hypothesis, ultimately concluding that while the hypothesis is fascinating, it is flawed and unsupported by the data. Vlieger noted that Tyrrell's work was well-structured and accessible, providing a valuable overview of Earth system science and palaeoclimatology. Despite criticizing many of Lovelock's claims, he acknowledged that Tyrrell still gave Lovelock credit for his originality and breadth of vision.

Jon Turney thought that Toby Tyrrell's book provided a clear and methodical evaluation of the Gaia theory, ultimately concluding that the theory does not hold up well against current evidence. Turney appreciated Tyrrell's rigorous assessment and his support for the co-evolution hypothesis, which aligns better with observations of Earth's history. He also acknowledged that while Tyrrell's critique of Gaia was convincing, Lovelock's Gaia theory significantly contributed to the rapid development of Earth system science.

David E. Moody described the book as a detailed, scholarly, and comprehensive analysis of the Gaia hypothesis. However, Moody noted that Tyrrell's critique seemed biased, likening his approach more to that of a prosecutor than an impartial observer. Moody also pointed out that Tyrrell's argument set an unrealistically high standard for the Gaia hypothesis, which Lovelock originally described as a tendency rather than a perfect system. Also, Tyrrell's reliance on the anthropic principle to argue that Earth's suitability for life might be due in part to sheer luck was critiqued by Moody as overstating the principle's implications. Moody concluded that while Tyrrell's book is an important contribution to the literature, it does not definitively disprove the Gaia hypothesis. Instead, Moody suggested that the hypothesis remains an open question, worthy of further investigation by future scientists.

=== Tyrrell's response to Moody ===
In his response to David E. Moody's review, Toby Tyrrell addressed the concern that his scientific evaluation of the Gaia hypothesis might have been compromised by his worry that belief in Gaia could lead to complacency about global environmental changes. Tyrrell clarified that this concern, discussed in the final chapter of his book, did not influence his scientific analysis, as the chapter was conceived and written after the scientific evaluation was completed. He asserted that his objectivity remained intact throughout the writing process and that his assessment of the Gaia hypothesis should be judged solely on the scientific arguments presented in the book.
