= Daniela Schiller =

Neuroscientist

- דניאלה שילר
- Born: 1972 (age 53–54); Rishon LeZion, Israel
- Education: Tel Aviv University, New York University
- Known for: Study of memory and trauma
- Scientific career
- Fields: trauma, neuroscience
- Workplaces: Mt Sinai School of Medicine

Daniela Schiller (Hebrew: דניאלה שילר; born October 26, 1972, in Israel) is a neuroscientist who leads the Affective Neuroscience Lab at the Mount Sinai School of Medicine. She is best known for her work on memory reconsolidation, and on modification of emotional learning and memory.

== Early life and education ==
Schiller was born in Rishon LeZion, Israel. She is the daughter of a Moroccan mother and a Ukrainian father. Schiller's father, Sigmund Schiller, is a survivor of the Holocaust. Schiller is the youngest of four children. She received a bachelor's degree in psychology and philosophy in 1996, and her doctorate in psychobiology from Tel Aviv University in 2004. She was awarded a Fulbright fellowship and worked with Elizabeth A. Phelps and Joseph E. LeDoux at New York University. Schiller plays drums and sings backing vocals for The Amygdaloids and Supersmall.

== Awards and recognition ==
- 2014 Klingenstein-Simons Fellowship in Neuroscience
- 2013 Kavli Frontiers of Science Fellow, National Academy of Sciences
- 2010 Blavatnik Award for Young Scientists
- 2005 Fulbright Scholar

== Scientific research ==
The goal of Schiller's research is to unravel the neurocognitive mechanisms that make emotional memories malleable, allowing for memory modification and for the adaptive adjustment of emotional and social behavior.

=== Research on the modulation of fear learning ===
Schiller's research addressed this question by using a behavioral paradigm called reversal learning in conjunction with physiological skin conductance measurements and neuroimaging. In this task, subjects first learned to associate one of two neutral stimuli with an aversive outcome (acquisition stage), and then had to flexibly modify this learning when the second stimulus began to predict the aversive outcome, while the initial predictive stimulus ceased to do so (reversal stage). The study found that responses in the amygdala and the striatum flexibly tracked the predictive aversive value of the conditioned stimuli, and switched their responses from one stimulus to another when reversal occurred. The ventromedial prefrontal cortex (vmPFC) also participated albeit in the opposite direction, showing stronger responses to the safe stimuli, but also dissociating 'naïve' safe stimuli from stimuli that used to be dangerous but are now safe. In order to identify a general mechanism underlying fear modulation regardless of the particular strategy used, Schiller and Mauricio Delgado demonstrated the overlapping neural systems mediating extinction, reversal and regulation of learned fear. Further research used the reversal learning data to dissociate the different computations performed by the striatum (prediction error) and amygdala (associability) during fear learning. The reversal protocol also helped identifying differences between combat veterans with or without a PTSD diagnosis in how they compute prediction error and update the value of fear predictive stimuli, and the neural tracking of these computations. Schiller's investigation was extended also to instrumental learning of active avoidance, revealing the neural mechanisms that predict successful active coping with threats in the human brain.

=== Research on memory reconsolidation ===
To examine the ability to modify emotional memory, Schiller's research focused on reconsolidation, which is a memory process of restabilizing a destabilized memory. Reconsolidation can be blocked using pharmacological agents, or non-invasive behavioral interference such as new motor learning during the reconsolidation of motor memories, new episodic learning during reconsolidation of declarative memory, and extinction learning during the reconsolidation of fear memory. Schiller's research demonstrated the interference of reconsolidation of fear memory using extinction in humans. One failure to reproduce this latter finding in an independent study or to validate the article's claims using the original data have cast doubts on whether it can be replicated. However, the authors contend that it is valid, the original data is publicly available and replicates, and of subsequent replications, about 80% (~50 experiments) were successful.

Additional research demonstrated retrieval-extinction interference in mice, rats, and humans. Additional demonstrations of retrieval-extinction were shown in juvenile rats and adolescents humans. Variations of the effect include retrieval followed by vicarious extinction and imaginal extinction. The retrieval-extinction procedure was also effective in clinical populations, including heroine addicts, tobacco smokers, PTSD and spider phobics with long-lasting effects. Some forms of therapy, such as coherence therapy, are built on the principles of memory reconsolidation and are designed to maximally optimize this process. Studies have also demonstrated engram specific manipulation of retrieval-extinction on remote memories. The Epigenetic priming of behavioral memory updating was shown to enable retrieval-extinction interference. Additional conceptual replications and demonstrations of reconsolidation updating using other forms of behavioral and non-invasive interferences have been reported. Some studies failed to replicate retrieval-extinction effects and disputed the results. Theoretical formulations and empirical work suggest that inconsistencies in reconsolidation effects may depend on the degree of memory destabilization, as not every memory recall involves neural destabilization; or on the efficacy of the interference, which could differ across individuals and populations.

=== Research on imagination ===
Using real-time fMRI, Schiller's research demonstrated that external motivational cues interact with neural substrates of motor imagery. The study also showed that neural regions that mediate motor imagery were synchronized with motor regions that produce actions. Another study extracted the whole brain signature of learned fear and demonstrate that fear responses could be extinguished by imagining of the conditioned stimuli. Imagined extinction engaged brain regions that were also recruited by actual extinction, including the amygdala and the ventromedial prefrontal cortex. Neural activity in the nucleus accumbens predicted the ability to successfully extinguish fear by using imagination.

=== Research on social navigation ===
The goal of this line of research is to uncover the neural representation of social relationships. Schiller's research have shown that forming first impressions recruits brain regions involved in emotion and valuation processes, including the amygdala and posterior cingulate cortex. Neural responses in these regions during an initial social encounter, predict subsequent impressions. This suggests that the attribution of social value to people and to things relies on similar basic neural mechanism rather than specialized neural circuits. Another line of research examines how the brain tracks dynamic social structure as people interact with others. To address this, Schiller's team created a social game in which participants arrive to an imaginary town and need to find a job and a place to live by interacting with the town's people. The study found that the location of each character relative to the participant in each interaction could be described by polar coordinates in a two-dimensional axis system of power and affiliation, and that these coordinates were encoded throughout the game by the hippocampus and the posterior cingulate cortex. The findings helped merging the divergent views of hippocampal function as a spatial navigation system versus a hub of episodic memories, and instead support the notion that the hippocampus represents a host of cognitive maps on various domains of experiences and across multiple dimensions.

== Select publications ==
- Homan, Philipp; Levy, Ifat; Feltham, Eric; Gordon, Charles; Hu, Jingchu; Li, Jian; Pietrzak, Robert H.; Southwick, Steven; Krystal, John H.; Harpaz-Rotem, Ilan; Schiller, Daniela (2019). "Neural computations of threat in the aftermath of combat trauma". Nature Neuroscience. 22 (3): 470–476. doi:10.1038/s41593-018-0315-x. PMC 6829910. PMID 30664770.
- Reddan, Marianne Cumella; Wager, Tor Dessart; Schiller, Daniela (21 November 2018). "Attenuating neural threat expression with imagination". Neuron. 100 (4): 994–1005.e4. doi:10.1016/j.neuron.2018.10.047. PMC 6314478. PMID 30465766.
- Schafer, Matthew; Schiller, Daniela (24 October 2018). "Navigating Social Space". Neuron. 100 (2): 476–489. doi:10.1016/j.neuron.2018.10.006. PMC 6226014. PMID 30359610.
- Lee, Jonathan L. C.; Nader, Karim; Schiller, Daniela (2017). "An update on memory reconsolidation updating". Trends in Cognitive Sciences. 21 (7): 531–545. doi:10.1016/j.tics.2017.04.006. PMC 5605913. PMID 28495311.
- Schiller, Daniela; Eichenbaum, Howard; Buffalo, Elizabeth A.; Davachi, Lila; Foster, David J.; Leutgeb, Stefan; Ranganath, Charan (14 October 2015). "Memory and Space: Towards an Understanding of the Cognitive Map". The Journal of Neuroscience. 35 (41): 13904–13911. doi:10.1523/JNEUROSCI.2618-15.2015. PMC 6608181. PMID 26468191.
- Tavares, Rita Morais; Mendelsohn, Avi; Grossman, Yael; Williams, Christian Hamilton; Shapiro, Matthew; Trope, Yaacov; Schiller, Daniela (1 July 2015). "A Map for Social Navigation in the Human Brain". Neuron. 87 (1): 231–243. doi:10.1016/j.neuron.2015.06.011. PMC 4662863. PMID 26139376.
- Mendelsohn, Avi; Pine, Alex; Schiller, Daniela (January 2014). "Between Thoughts and Actions: Motivationally Salient Cues Invigorate Mental Action in the Human Brain". Neuron. 81 (1): 207–217. doi:10.1016/j.neuron.2013.10.019. PMID 24333054.
- Collins, Katherine A.; Mendelsohn, Avi; Cain, Christopher K.; Schiller, Daniela (29 October 2014). "Taking Action in the Face of Threat: Neural Synchronization Predicts Adaptive Coping". The Journal of Neuroscience. 34 (44): 14733–14738. doi:10.1523/JNEUROSCI.2152-14.2014. PMC 4212070. PMID 25355225.
