= James Kirchner =

American ecologist and professor

James W. Kirchner is professor of Earth and Planetary Science at University of California, Berkeley. His current research spans the fields of geomorphology, hydrology, environmental geochemistry, evolutionary ecology, and paleobiology. He currently serves as the director of Berkeley's Central Sierra Field Research Stations.

A study by Kirchner and Anne Weil showed that the time taken for life on earth to recover from extinction episodes such as that which destroyed the dinosaurs is not, as previously thought, proportional to the damage done. Instead, Kirchner and Wiel, analyzing fossil record data compiled by Jack Sepkoski, found that recovery time for catastrophic die-offs was about 10 million years regardless of the number of species lost. Kirchner has also been an active critic of the Gaia hypothesis.
