= Tyler Volk =

American professor of environmental studies and biology

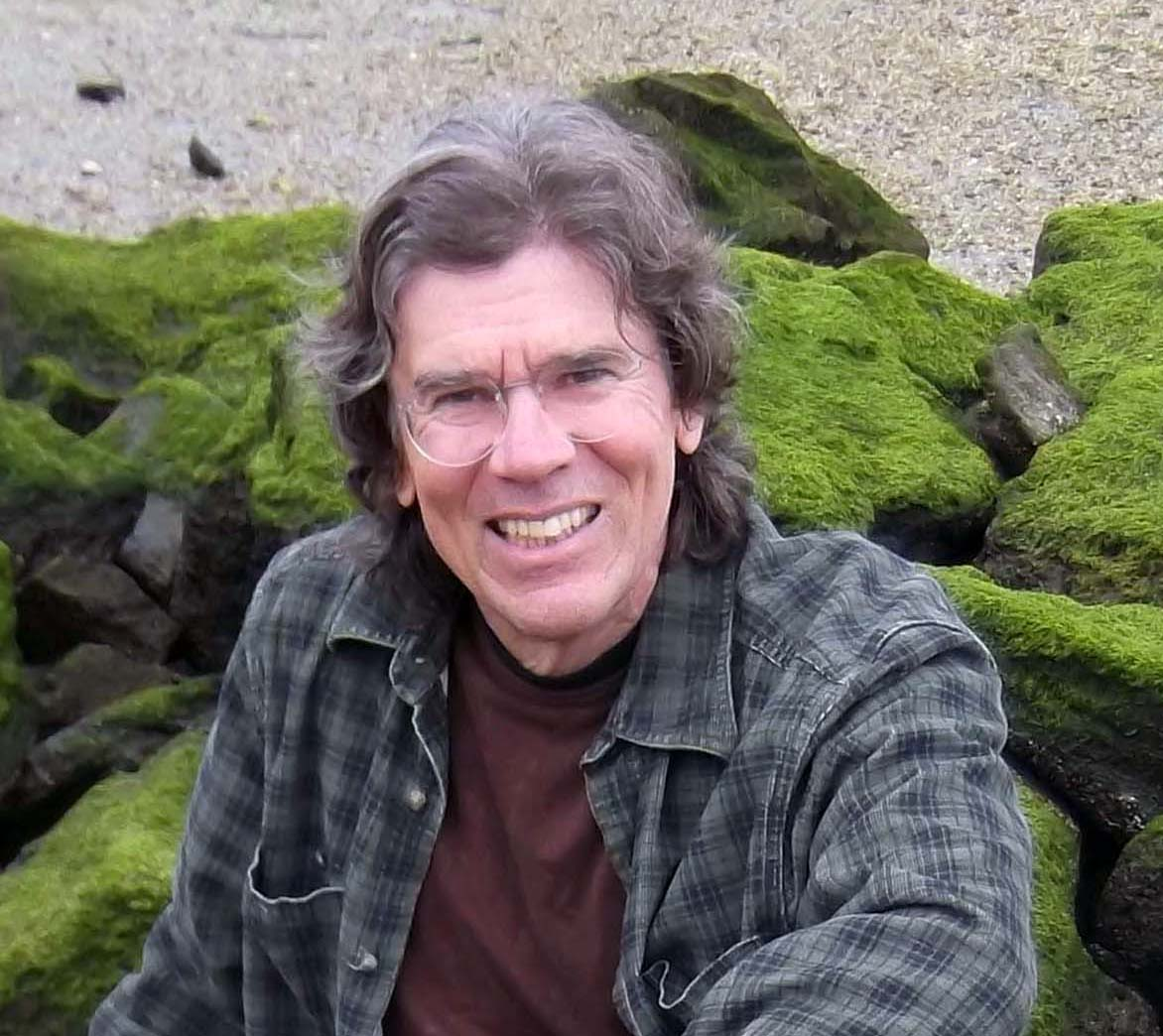
- Born: United States
- Education: University of Michigan (BA) New York University (MA, PhD)
- Scientific career
- Fields: Climate; Biogeochemical cycles; Energy; Environmental studies; Metapatterns
- Institutions: New York University
- Doctoral advisor: Martin Hoffert
- Website: NYU website; Personal website

Tyler Volk is a Professor Emeritus of Environmental Studies and Biology at New York University (NYU). His areas of interest include environmental challenges to global prosperity, global changes in CO_{2}, biosphere theory, and the role of life in Earth's dynamics. He first attended the University of Michigan, graduating with a Bachelors in Architecture in 1971; he later graduated from NYU with a Masters in Applied Sciences in 1982 and a PhD in Applied Sciences in 1984.

== Environmental studies and teaching ==
Volk worked on the planning and development of the Environmental Studies Program with Dale Jamieson and Christopher Schlottmann, launching it in 2007; the program became a department in NYU’s Faculty of Arts and Science in 2014. Volk was awarded NYU’s “Golden Dozen” teaching award in both 2004 and 2008. Volk also received a Distinguished Teaching Award in 2009.

== Biosphere science ==
Volk's research explores Earth's biosphere, modeling the global carbon cycle, and quantifying the biological and physical impacts from the ocean and biosphere on it.

In 2000, Volk served on the American Geophysical Union's Chapman Conference on the Gaia Hypothesis program committee in Valencia, Spain. His presentation, “Gaia is life in a wasteworld of by-products”, was published in 2004. He has debated James Lovelock, Tim Lenton and David Wilkinson on various concepts relating to the Gaia Hypothesis. Volk also publicly debated Axel Kleidon on the role of entropy in the biosphere.

== NASA advanced life support ==
Volk developed math models for element cycling in "closed ecological life support systems" (CELSS) at NASA and remained active in the subfield of advanced life support from 1986 to 1998. He and colleague John Rummel developed early computer models that demonstrated the chemical transformations of crop production, human metabolism, and waste processing. Volk later studied crop growth and development for enhanced productivity, collaborating with crop physiologists Bruce Bugbee of Utah State University, Raymond Wheeler of the NASA Kennedy Space Center, and Ph.D. students Francesco Tubiello and James Cavazonni at NYU.

== Books ==
Tyler Volk has authored seven books, including CO_{2} Rising: The World’s Greatest Environmental Challenge, What is Death?: A Scientist Looks at the Cycle of Life, Gaia's Body: Toward a Physiology of Earth, and Metapatterns: Across Space, Time, and Mind.

In 2017, he published Quarks to Culture: How We Came to Be, which explores what Tyler Volk calls the "grand sequence", which outlines a series of evolutionary levels from elementary quanta to globalized human civilization. The book was reviewed in Science in January 2018.

== Book reviews ==
- CO2 Rising: The World’s Greatest Environmental Challenge — Review by Ning Zeng — Bulletin of the American Meteorological Society (March, 2010) — https://headlines.ametsoc.org/wp-content/uploads/2025/08/March2010BAMS.pdf
- CO2 Rising: The World’s Greatest Environmental Challenge — Review by Science News (March 13, 20009) — https://www.sciencenews.org/article/co2-rising-worlds-greatest-environmental-challenge-tyler-volk
- Gaia's Body: Toward a Physiology of Earth — Review by Betty Carvellas — The American Biology Teacher (March, 1999)
- From Quarks to Culture: How We Came To Be — Review by By Leon Vlieger — The Inquisitive Biologist IMarch 6, 2019) — https://inquisitivebiologist.com/2019/03/06/book-review-quarks-to-culture-how-we-came-to-be/
