= Jainism =

Indian religion

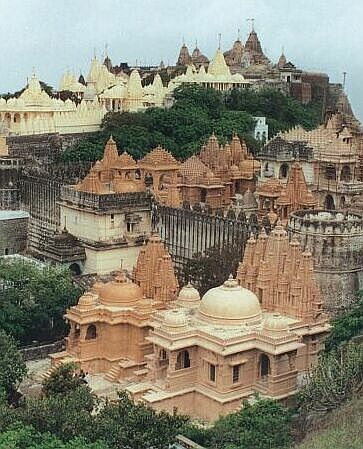
- Jain temples on Shatrunjaya hill near Palitana, Gujarat
- Classification: Indian religion

Jainism (/ˈdʒeɪnɪzəm, ˈdʒaɪnɪzəm/ JAY-niz-əm, JYE-niz-əm), also known as Jain Dharma, is an Indian religion that teaches a path toward spiritual purity and enlightenment through disciplined nonviolence (ahimsa) to all living creatures. The tradition is spiritually guided by 24 tirthankaras (ford-makers), supreme teachers who have conquered the cycle of rebirth and attained omniscience (kevala jnana). The core of Jain philosophy is established on three ethical pillars: ahiṃsā (nonviolence), anekāntavāda (non-absolutism or many-sided reality), and aparigraha (non-possession). While its ultimate spiritual goal is moksha (liberation from karma), these ethical principles have historically fostered a community renowned for its high literacy, trusted role in commerce, and distinct intellectual culture.

Jain philosophy includes the doctrine of "anekāntavāda", which holds that truth and reality are complex and have multiple aspects, and that no single viewpoint is absolutely complete. This framework encourages intellectual humility and conflict resolution, in contrast to what the tradition terms "one-sided" ("ekānta") views. Ethically, the vow of "aparigraha" (non-attachment) requires monks to renounce all property, and encourages laypersons to limit their possessions and desires ("iccha-parimana"). Historically, the application of nonviolence led the Jain community to avoid agriculture and warfare, with many Jains engaging in trade and banking, becoming a mercantile presence in ancient and medieval India. The community supported networks of temples, libraries, and charitable institutions.

The tradition views itself as eternal, with the tirthankaras guiding every cosmic time cycle. In the current cycle, the first tirthankara was Rishabhanatha, credited in tradition with establishing civilized society. The 23rd tirthankara, Pārśvanātha, is dated by historians to the c. 8th or 7th century BCE, making him likely the tradition's earliest historical figure. The 24th and final tirthankara, Mahavira c. 6th or 5th century BCE, was a contemporary of the Buddha and a central figure in the Śramaṇa movement of Greater Magadha, which rejected the authority of the Vedas and established the current ascetic order.

Jainism has between four and five million followers, known as Jains or Jainas, residing mostly in India, with diaspora communities in North America, Europe, and East Asia. The community is divided into two major sub-traditions, the Digambaras ("sky-clad") and Śvētāmbaras ("white-clad"), which differ on ascetic practices, gender, and canonical texts, while sharing a core philosophy. Jains have contributed to the development of logic, art, architecture, law, and ethics in Indian culture. Major festivals include Paryushana or (Das Lakshana), Akshaya Tritiya, Mahavir Janma Kalyanak, and Diwali.

== Etymology ==
The name Jainism comes from ji (Sanskrit), "to conquer", referring to the battle against the passions and bodily desires, aiming to reach omniscience. Those few who accomplish this are called jina, "conqueror". Adherents are called jain or jaina, "follower of the conquerors", a term which replaced the older name nirgrantha, bondless, which was only used for ascetic wanderers.

== Jain doctrine and philosophy ==
=== Ratnatraya (the three jewels) ===
The hand symbolizes Ahiṃsā, the wheel dharmachakra, the resolve to halt saṃsāra (transmigration).

The salvational goal for ascetics is to reach moksha (liberation), while for most Jain laypersons it is to accumulate good karma that leads to better rebirth and a step closer to liberation. Purification of the soul and liberation are held to be achievable through the three jewels (ratnatraya): samyak darśana, (right vision or faith in the Jain teachings or scriptures, more specifically the seven tattvas); (Note: According to Padmanabh S. Jaini, samyak darśana is acceptance of the truth of soul (jīva).) samyak gyana, (right knowledge and understanding of the Jain teachings, more specifically of self (jiva) and non-self (ajiva)); and samyak charitra, (correct conduct, behavior consistent with these teachings and the five vows.) Jain texts often add "samyak tapas" (correct asceticism) as a fourth jewel, emphasizing ascetic practices as the means to liberation (moksha). The four jewels are called Moksha Marga (the path of liberation).

The core of Jainism is also summarized in the three tenets of ahiṃsā (nonviolence), aparigraha (asceticism), and anekāntavāda (a rejection of all simplistic and one-sided views of truth and reality).

=== Core principles (the vows) ===
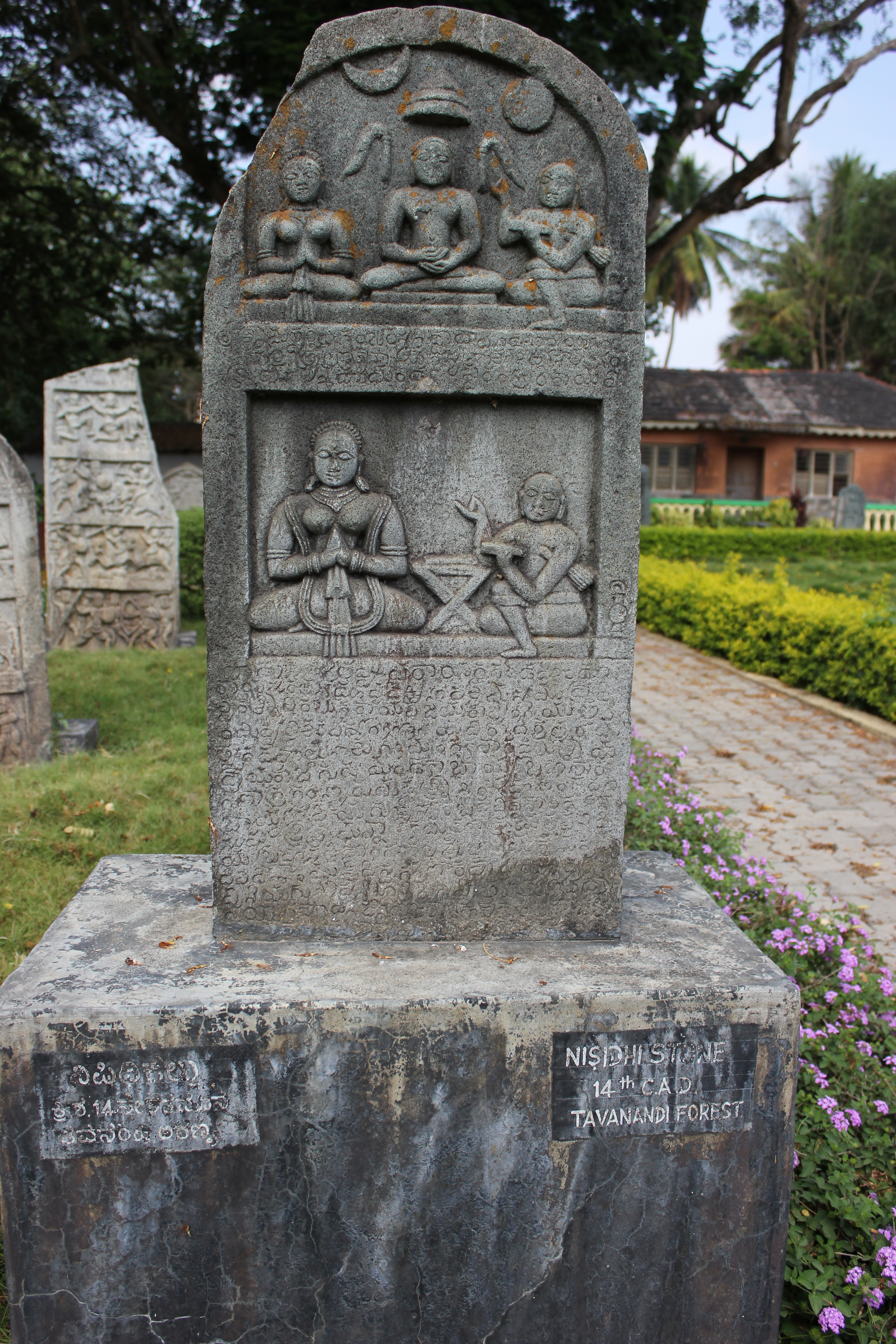
Nishidhi stone, depicting the vow of sallekhana, 14th century, Karnataka

Jainism teaches five ethical duties, which it calls five vows. These are called anuvratas (small vows) for Jain laypersons, and mahavratas (great vows) for Jain mendicants. For both, its moral precepts preface that the Jain has access to a guru (teacher, counsellor), deva (Jina, god), doctrine, and that the individual is free from five offences: doubts about the faith, indecisiveness about the truths of Jainism, insincerity of desire for Jain teachings, non-recognition of fellow Jains, and insufficient admiration of fellow Jains' spiritual endeavors. Such a person undertakes the following five vows of Jainism:

1. Ahiṃsā, ("intentional non-violence" or "noninjury") is the first major vow, to cause no harm to other human beings as well as all living beings, particularly animals. This is the highest ethical duty in Jainism, and it applies not only to one's actions, but demands that one be non-violent in one's speech and thoughts.
2. Satya, ("truth") is the vow is to always speak the truth. Neither lie, nor speak what is not true, and do not encourage others or approve anyone who speaks an untruth.
3. Asteya, ("not stealing") A Jain layperson should not take anything that is not willingly given. Additionally, a Jain mendicant should ask for permission to take it if something is being given.
4. Brahmacharya, ("celibacy") Abstinence from sex and sensual pleasures is prescribed for Jain monks and nuns. For laypersons, the vow means chastity, faithfulness to one's partner.
5. Aparigraha, ("non-possessiveness") This includes non-attachment to material and psychological possessions, avoiding craving and greed. Jain monks and nuns completely renounce property and social relations, own nothing and are attached to no one.

Jainism prescribes seven supplementary vows, including three guņa vratas (merit vows) and four śikşā vratas. The Sallekhana (or Santhara) vow is a "religious death" ritual observed at the end of life, historically by Jain monks and nuns, but rare in the modern age. In this vow, there is voluntary and gradual reduction of food and liquid intake to end one's life by choice and with dispassion. This is believed to reduce negative karma that affects a soul's future rebirths.

==== Ahimsa – non-violence ====
The principle of ahimsa (non-violence or non-injury) is a fundamental tenet of Jainism. It holds that one must abandon all violent activity and that without such a commitment to non-violence all religious behavior is worthless. In Jain theology, it does not matter how correct or defensible the violence may be, one must not kill or harm any being, and non-violence is the highest religious duty. Jain texts such as Ācārāṅga Sūtra and Tattvarthasūtra state that one must renounce all killing of living beings, whether tiny or large, movable or immovable. Its theology teaches that one must neither kill another living being, nor cause another to kill, nor consent to any killing directly or indirectly.

Furthermore, Jainism emphasizes non-violence against all beings not only in action but also in speech and in thought. It states that instead of hate or violence against anyone, "all living creatures must help each other". (Note: This view, however, is not shared by all Jain sub-traditions. For example, the Terapanthi Jain tradition, with about 250,000 followers, considers both good karma such as compassionate charity, and bad karma such as sin, as binding one's soul to worldly morality. It states that any karma leads to a negation of the "absolute non-violence" principle, given man's limited perspective. It recommends that the monk or nun seeking salvation must avoid hurting or helping any being in any form.) Jains believe that violence negatively affects and destroys one's soul, particularly when the violence is done with intent, hate or carelessness, or when one indirectly causes or consents to the killing of a human or non-human living being.

The doctrine exists in Hinduism and Buddhism, but is most highly developed in Jainism. The theological basis of non-violence as the highest religious duty has been interpreted by some Jain scholars not to "be driven by merit from giving or compassion to other creatures, nor a duty to rescue all creatures", but resulting from "continual self-discipline", a cleansing of the soul that leads to one's own spiritual development which ultimately affects one's salvation and release from rebirths. Jains believe that causing injury to any being in any form creates bad karma which affects one's rebirth, future well-being and causes suffering.

Late medieval Jain scholars re-examined the Ahiṃsā doctrine when faced with external threat or violence. For example, they justified violence by monks to protect nuns. According to Dundas, the Jain scholar Jinadattasuri wrote during a time of destruction of temples and persecution that "anybody engaged in a religious activity who was forced to fight and kill somebody would not lose any spiritual merit but instead attain deliverance". However, examples in Jain texts that condone fighting and killing under certain circumstances are relatively rare. (Note: Jain literature, like Buddhist and Hindu literature, has also debated the aspects of violence and non-violence in food creation.)

==== Aparigraha – non-attachment ====
The third main principle in Jainism is aparigraha which means non-attachment to worldly possessions. For monks and nuns, Jainism requires a vow of complete non-possession of any property, relations and emotions. The ascetic is a wandering mendicant in the Digambara tradition, or a resident mendicant in the Śvētāmbara tradition. For Jain laypersons, it recommends limited possession of property that has been honestly earned, and giving excess property to charity. According to Natubhai Shah, aparigraha applies to both the material and the psychic. Material possessions refer to various forms of property. Psychic possessions refer to emotions, likes and dislikes, and attachments of any form. Unchecked attachment to possessions is said to result in direct harm to one's personality.

=== Metaphysics and cosmology ===
Jain metaphysics explains the nature of the universe and its interaction with the soul (jiva). It posits that the soul is an eternal entity that is separate from the body and the physical world. Their interaction is what defines the cycle of rebirth (Saṃsāra).

==== Soul and karma ====
According to Jain beliefs, vibrational energy (virya) draws karmic particles to the soul and creates bondages. Purification of soul from karmic particles and thereby liberation can be achieved through ratnatraya, the path of the three jewels, namely samyak darśana, correct faith in the Jain teachings; samyak gyana, correct knowledge and understanding of those teachings; and samyak charitra, correct conduct, behavior consistent with the five vows. (Note: The five vows are: ahiṃsā (non-violence), satya (truth), asteya (not stealing), brahmacharya (chastity), and aparigraha (non-possessiveness).)

Jainism, like other Indian religions, believes in karma, but with a unique and fundamental difference. It is the only tradition that conceives of karma as a physical, material substance—subtle, invisible particles of matter (pudgala) that exist in the universe. These particles are drawn to the soul (jiva) by its actions, thoughts, and words.

This "karmic dirt" then sticks to the soul, obscuring its innate, pure qualities of consciousness and bliss. This bondage of karma is the cause of the soul's entrapment in Saṃsāra and its repeated cycles of birth and death.

==== The Tattvas (fundamental truths) ====
The tattvas are the seven (or nine) fundamental truths that form the basis of the entire Jain path. They describe the step-by-step process of karmic bondage and liberation:

1. Jīva – The living, sentient soul.
2. Ajīva – Non-living substances, including matter, time, and karma.
3. Āsrava – The influx or inflow of karmic particles to the soul.
4. Bandha – The bondage of these karmic particles to the soul.
5. Saṃvara – The stoppage of new karmic inflow (achieved by vows and discipline).
6. Nirjarā – The shedding or purification of existing, bound karma (achieved by asceticism).
7. Moksha – The complete liberation of the soul, freeing it from all karma to regain its pure, omniscient state.

Some texts add two more categories, Punya (good karma) and Paapa (bad karma), as sub-types of Āsrava and Bandha, making nine tattvas in total.

==== Saṃsāra (cycle of rebirth) ====
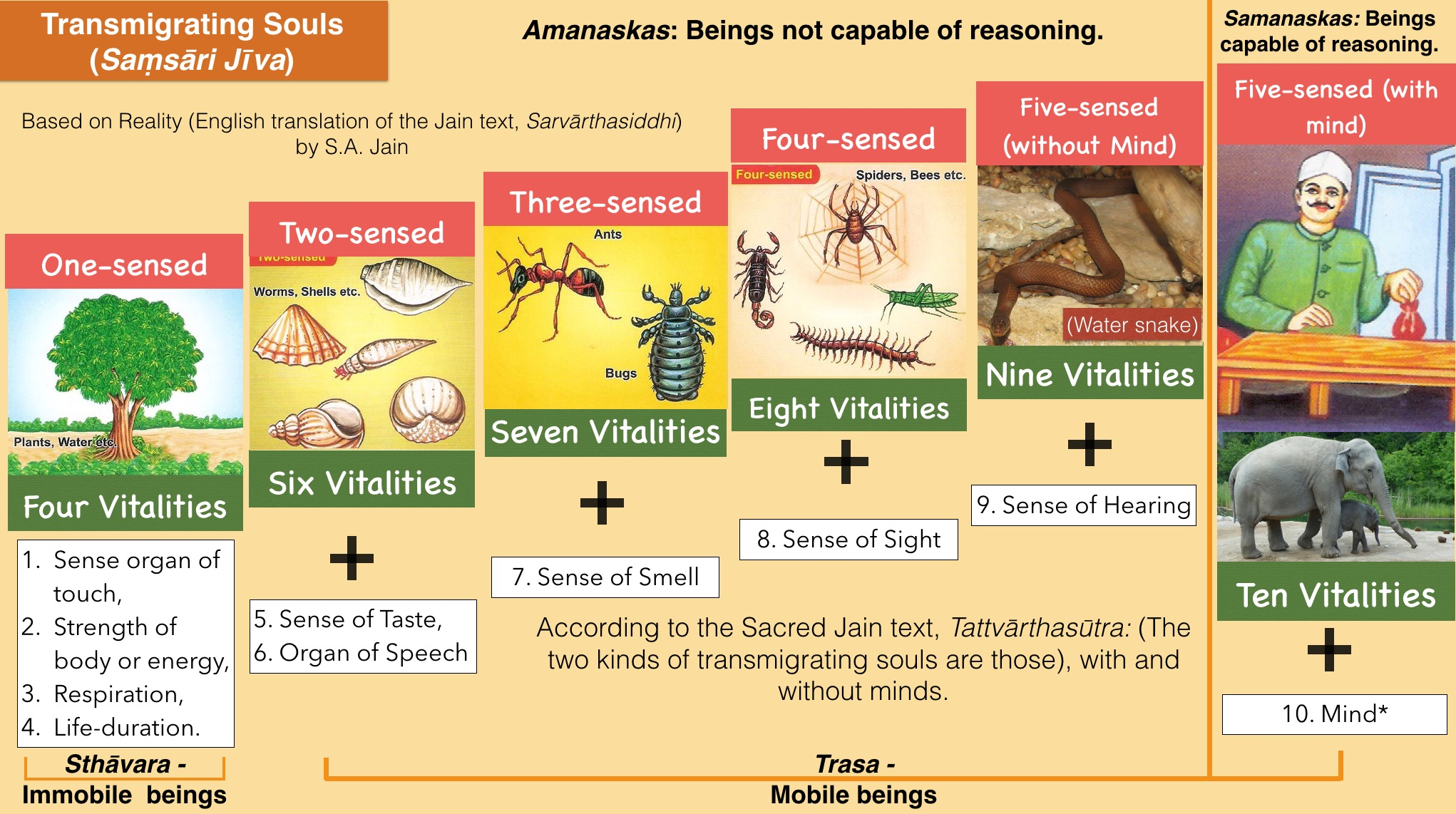
Classification of Saṃsāri Jīvas (transmigrating souls) in Jainism

Saṃsāra is the doctrine of the worldly cycle of birth, death, and rebirth, through which the soul transmigrates based on its karma. This cycle is considered the natural state of existence, but it is also one of suffering, and the ultimate aim of Jainism is liberation (Moksha) from it.

According to Jain tradition, souls can be reborn in one of four states of existence (gatis): as heavenly beings, humans, animals/plants, or hellish beings. Jain theosophy also describes a vast number of potential birth-situations, traditionally 8.4 million, through which the unliberated soul cycles. Jain philosophy also uniquely posits the existence of abhavya (incapable) souls, a category of souls that are eternally trapped in Saṃsāra and can never attain liberation.

==== Cosmology: substance, time, and realms ====
Jain cosmology views the universe as an uncreated, eternal, and self-sustaining entity. It was never created by a god and will never be destroyed.

This universe is composed of six eternal substances known as dravya:

1. Jīva (the living soul)
2. Pudgala (non-sentient matter)
3. Dharma (the principle of motion)
4. Adharma (the principle of rest)
5. Ākāśa (space)
6. Kāla (time)

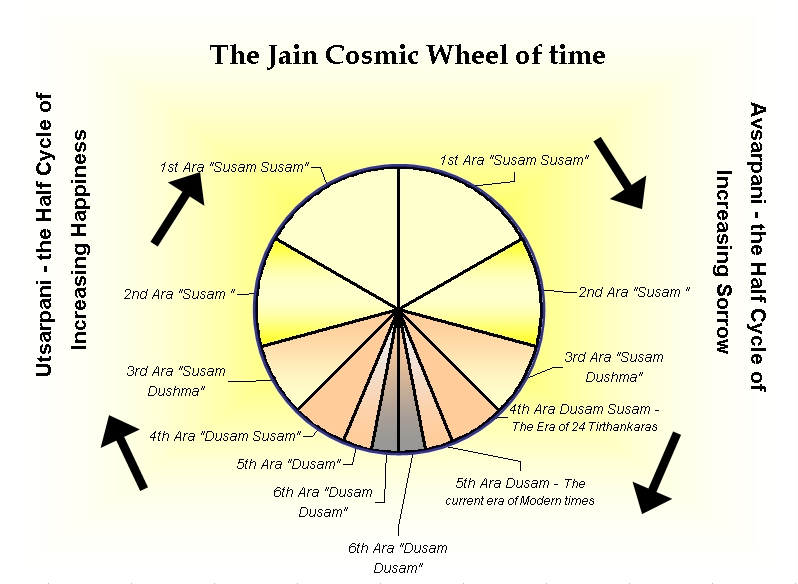
Division of time in Jain cosmology

Kāla (time) is itself conceived as a boundless, eternal wheel (kālachakra) that rotates ceaselessly. It is divided into two half-cycles: an ascending arc (utsarpiṇī) of progressive happiness and virtue, and a descending arc (avasarpiṇī) of progressive sorrow and decline.

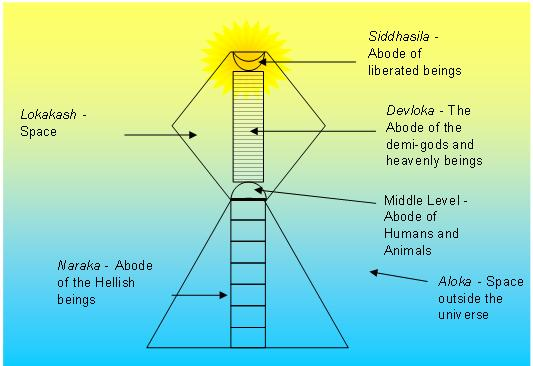
Rebirth loka (realms of existence) in Jain cosmology

The universe itself is structurally divided into three realms, or lokas: the Urdhva Loka (upper world of heavenly beings), the Madhya Loka (middle world of humans, animals, and plants), and the Adho Loka (lower world of hellish beings). All unliberated souls, including gods and demons, transmigrate through these three realms based on their karma.

=== Epistemology ===
Jain philosophy accepts three reliable means of knowledge (pramana). It holds that correct knowledge is based on perception (pratyaksa), inference (anumana), and testimony (sabda or the word of scriptures). These ideas are elaborated in Jain texts such as Tattvarthasūtra, Parvacanasara, Nandi and Anuyogadvarini. Some Jain texts add analogy (upamana) as the fourth reliable means, in a manner similar to epistemological theories found in other Indian religions.

In Jainism, jnāna (knowledge) is said to be of five kinds—mati jñāna (sensory knowledge), śrutu jñāna (scriptural knowledge), avadhi jñāna (clairvoyance), manah prayāya Jñāna (telepathy) and kevala jnana (omniscience). According to the Jain text Tattvartha sūtra, the first two are indirect knowledge, and the remaining three are direct knowledge.

==== Anekāntavāda - many-sided reality ====
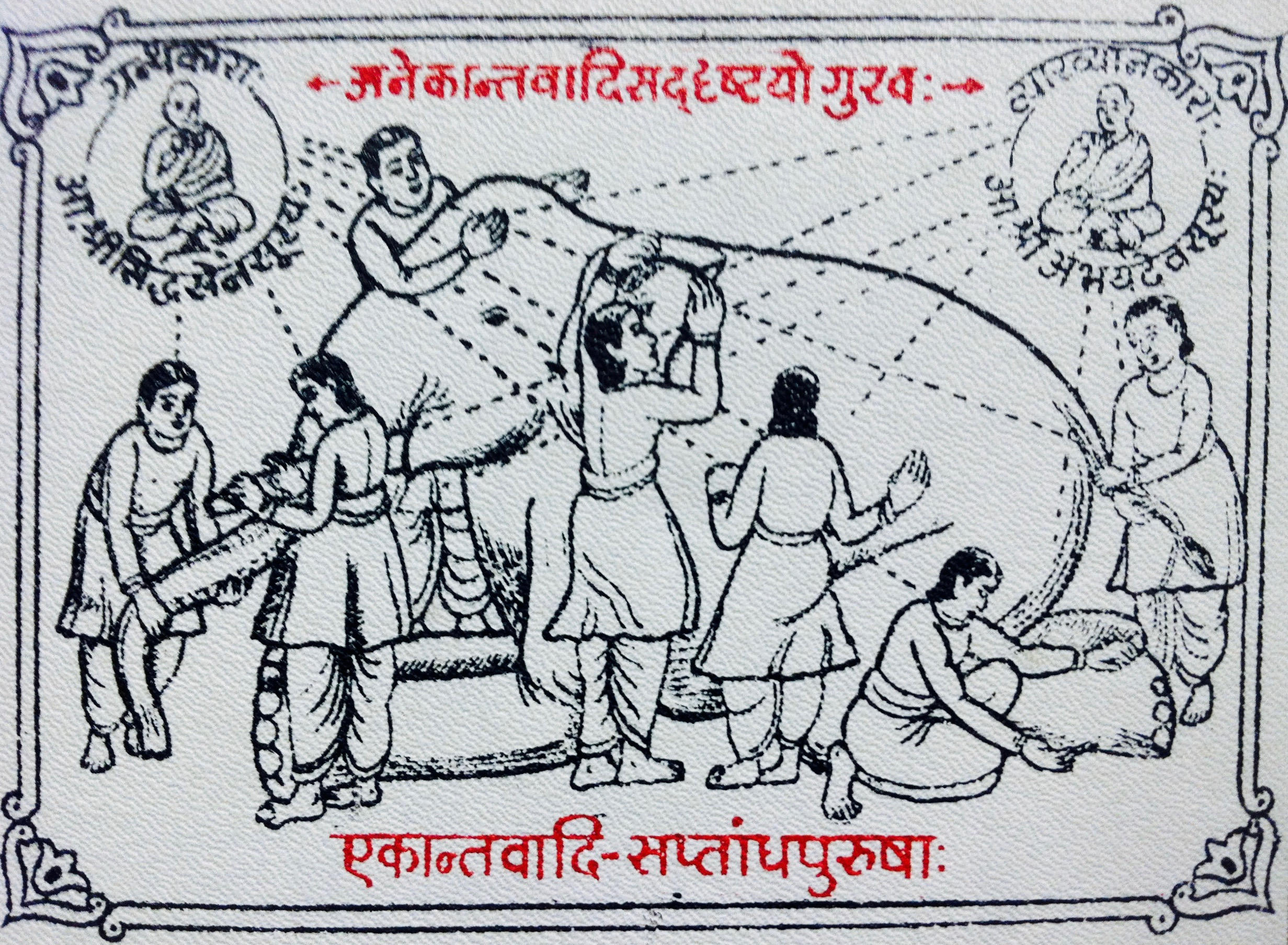
Jain temple painting explaining Anekantavada with blind men and an elephant

The second main principle of Jainism is anekāntavāda, from anekānta ("many-sidedness", etymologically "non-oneness" or "not being one") and vada ("doctrine"). The doctrine states that truth and reality are complex and always have multiple aspects. It further states that reality can be experienced, but cannot be fully expressed with language. It suggests that human attempts to communicate are Naya, "partial expression of the truth". According to it, one can experience the taste of truth, but cannot fully express that taste through language. It holds that attempts to express experience are syāt, or valid "in some respect", but remain "perhaps, just one perspective, incomplete". It concludes that in the same way, spiritual truths can be experienced but not fully expressed. It suggests that the great error is belief in ekānta (one-sidedness), where some relative truth is treated as absolute. The doctrine is ancient, found in Buddhist texts such as the Samaññaphala Sutta. The Jain Agamas suggest that Mahāvīra's approach to answering all metaphysical philosophical questions was a "qualified yes" (syāt). These texts identify anekāntavāda as a key difference from the Buddha's teachings. The Buddha taught the Middle Way, rejecting extremes of the answer "it is" or "it is not" to metaphysical questions. The Mahāvīra, in contrast, taught his followers to accept both "it is", and "it is not", qualified with "perhaps", to understand Absolute Reality. The permanent being is conceptualized as jiva (soul) and ajiva (matter) within a dualistic anekāntavāda framework.

According to Paul Dundas, in contemporary times the anekāntavāda doctrine has been interpreted by some Jains as intending to "promote a universal religious tolerance", and a teaching of "plurality" and "benign attitude to other [ethical, religious] positions". Dundas states this is a misreading of historical texts and Mahāvīra's teachings. According to him, the "many pointedness, multiple perspective" teachings of the Mahāvīra is about the nature of absolute reality and human existence. He claims that it is not about condoning activities such as killing animals for food, nor violence against disbelievers or any other living being as "perhaps right". The five vows for Jain monks and nuns, for example, are strict requirements and there is no "perhaps" about them. Similarly, since ancient times, Jainism co-existed with Buddhism and Hinduism according to Dundas, but Jainism disagreed, in specific areas, with the knowledge systems and beliefs of these traditions, and vice versa.

=== Concept of God and Tirthankaras ===
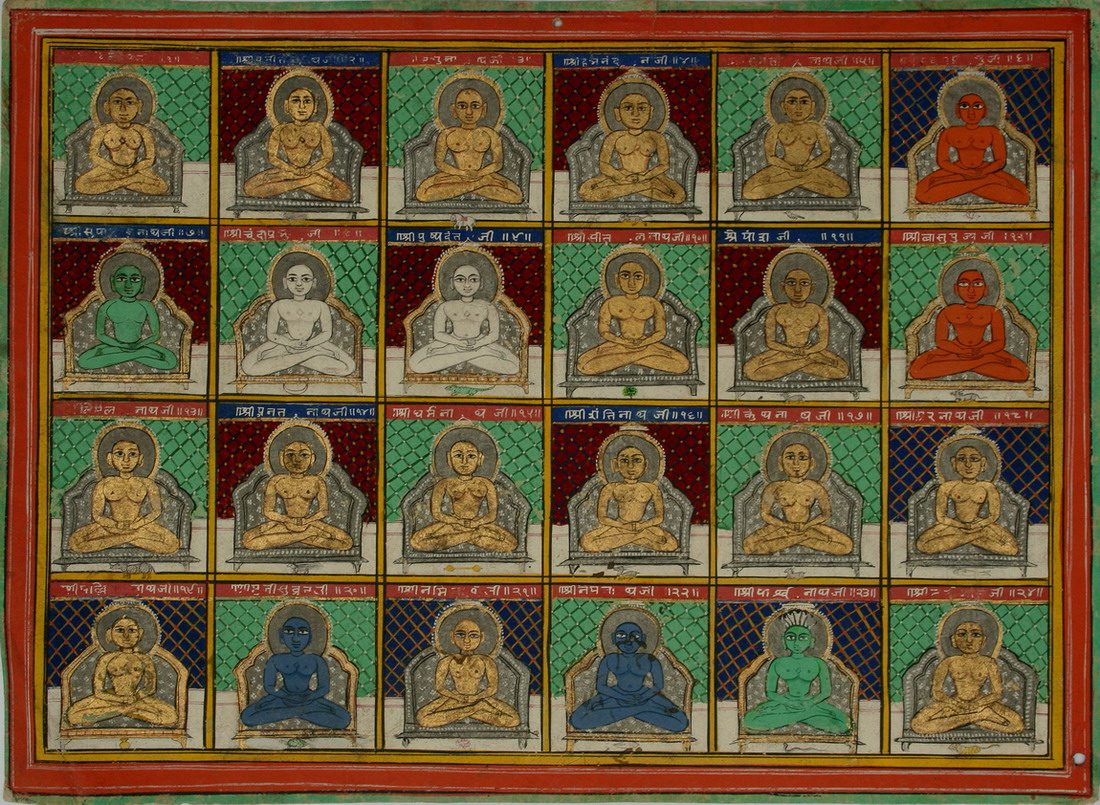
Jain miniature painting of 24 tirthankaras, Jaipur, c. 1850

Jainism is a transtheistic religion, holding that the universe was not created, and will exist forever. The universe is independent, having no creator, governor, judge, or destroyer. In this, it is unlike the Abrahamic religions and the theistic strands of Hinduism, but similar to Buddhism. However, Jainism believes in the world of heavenly and hellish beings who are born, die, and reborn like earthly beings. The souls who live happily in the body of a heavenly celestial do so because of their positive karma. It is further stated that they possess a more transcendent knowledge about material things and can anticipate events in the human realms. However, once their past karmic merit is exhausted, it is explained that their souls are reborn again as humans, animals, or other beings. The perfect enlightened souls with a body are called Arihants (victors) and perfect souls without a body are called Siddhas (liberated souls). Only a soul with a human body can attain enlightenment and liberation. The liberated beings are the supreme beings and are worshipped by all heavenly, earthly, and hellish beings who aspire to attain liberation themselves.

== History ==
=== Origins: Parshvanatha and Mahavira ===
Jainism is an ancient Indian religion rooted in the independent Śramaṇa (ascetic) tradition, which developed alongside but distinct from the orthodox Vedic religion. Jains maintain that their faith is eternal, guided in the current cosmic time cycle by a succession of 24 tirthankaras, beginning with Rishabhanatha. Archaeological excavations at the Indus Valley Civilization (c. 3300–1300 BCE) have yielded seals depicting nude figures in upright meditative postures (kayotsarga) alongside bull iconography. Scholars such as Heinrich Zimmer and Vilas Sangave have proposed these as early representations of proto-Jain asceticism and Rishabhanatha, whose traditional emblem is the bull. However, because the Indus script remains undeciphered, mainstream historians treat this link as a hypothesis regarding a broader pre-Vedic Śramaṇa culture rather than definitive proof of early Jainism. According to the 20th-century scholar of comparative religion Sarvepalli Radhakrishnan, Jainism was in existence before the Vedas were composed. (Note: Long notes that Ṛṣabha, the first Tīrthaṅkara of Jainism, means "bull," and that images of bulls are found at seals from the Indus Valley civilization, speculating that they may be related to Jainism.)

While modern historians do not consider the first 22 tirthankaras to be verified historical figures, they are deeply integrated into broader Indian epic chronology. Jain traditional texts describe the 20th tirthankara, Munisuvrata, as a historical contemporary of Rama, and the 22nd tirthankara, Neminatha, as a first cousin of the Hindu deity Krishna.

The 23rd Tirthankara, Parshvanatha, was likely a historical being, dated by the Jain tradition to the ninth century BCE; historians date him to the eighth or seventh century BCE. Parshvanatha may have founded a proto-Jain ascetic community which subsequently got revived and reformed by Mahavira.

Mahāvīra is considered a contemporary of the Buddha, in around the sixth or 5th century BCE. The interaction between the two religions began with the Buddha; later, they competed for followers and the merchant trade networks that sustained them. Buddhist and Jain texts sometimes have the same or similar titles but present different doctrines.

Kings Bimbisara (c. 558–491 BCE), Ajatashatru (c. 492–460 BCE), and Udayin (c. 460–440 BCE) of the Haryanka dynasty were patrons of Jainism. Jain tradition states that Chandragupta Maurya (322–298 BCE), the founder of the Mauryan Empire and grandfather of Ashoka, became a monk and disciple of Jain ascetic Bhadrabahu in the later part of his life. Jain texts state that he died intentionally at Shravanabelagola by fasting.

=== Epigraphic and archaeological evidence ===
The historicity of Jainism is supported by epigraphic and archaeological evidence. The Hathigumpha Inscription at the Udayagiri Caves in Odisha, dated to the 2nd century BCE, is a key piece of early evidence. This inscription, from King Kharavela of Kalinga, details his patronage of Jain monks. It also provides a historical reference by mentioning the retrieval of a Jina idol taken from Kalinga by a Nanda dynasty king (c. 4th century BCE).

Additionally, excavations at Kankali Tila in Mathura have provided extensive archaeological evidence of an early Jain center. The site yielded numerous Jain stupas, statues, and ayagapatas (votive tablets) dating from the 2nd century BCE to the 2nd century CE. These tablets, commissioned by lay followers (śrāvakas), represent early physical evidence of an organized sangha (community) that included monks, nuns, and laity.

The third century BCE emperor Ashoka, in his pillar edicts, mentions the Niganthas (Jains). Tirthankara statues date back to the second century BCE. Archeological evidence suggests that Mathura was an important Jain center from the second century BCE. onwards. Inscriptions from as early as the first century CE already show the schism between Digambara and Śvētāmbara. There is inscriptional evidence for the presence of Jain monks in south India by the second or first centuries BCE, and archaeological evidence of Jain monks in Saurashtra in Gujarat by the second century CE.

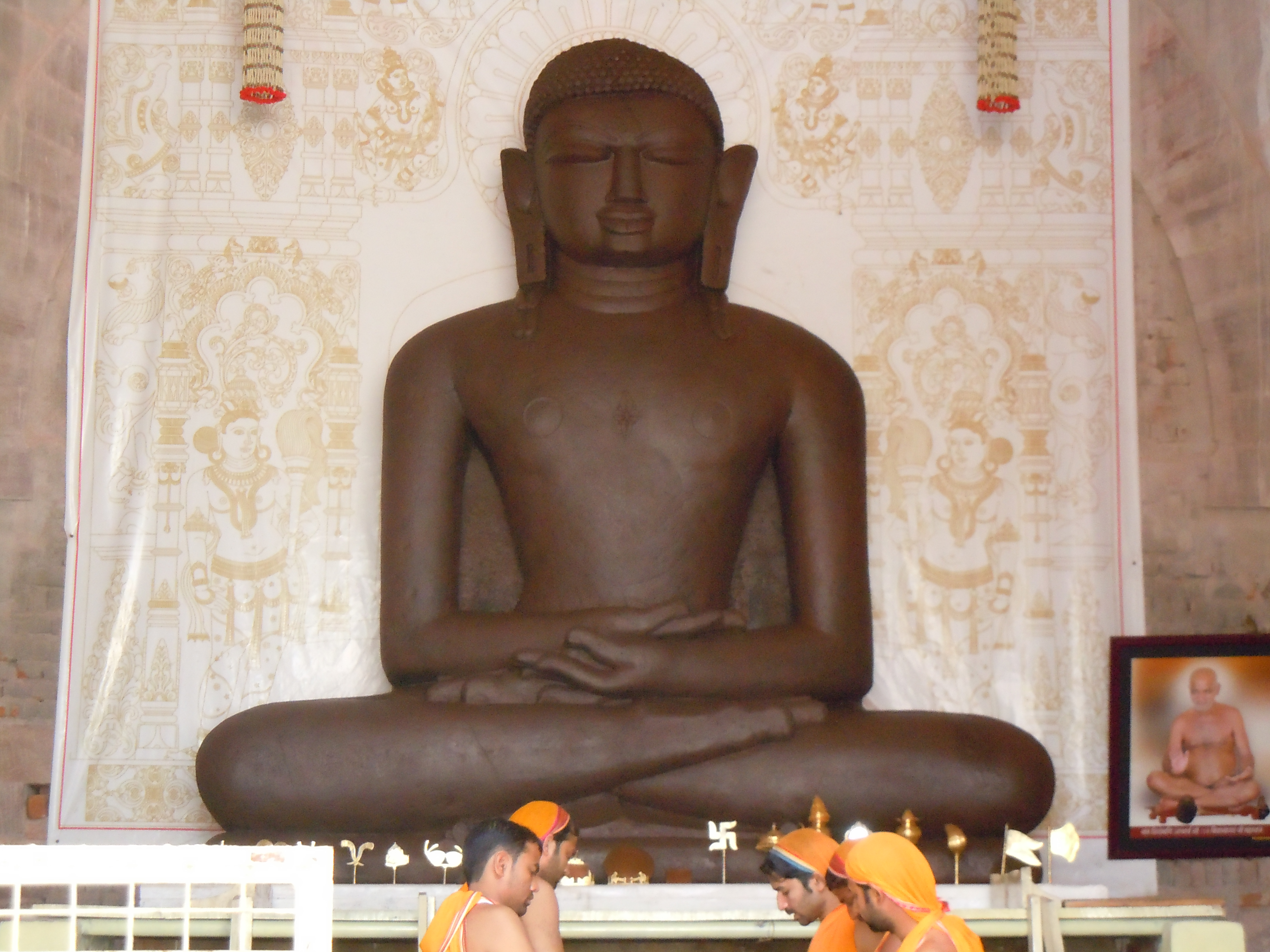
Rishabhdev, believed to have lived over 592.704×10^{18} years ago, is considered the traditional founder of Jainism.

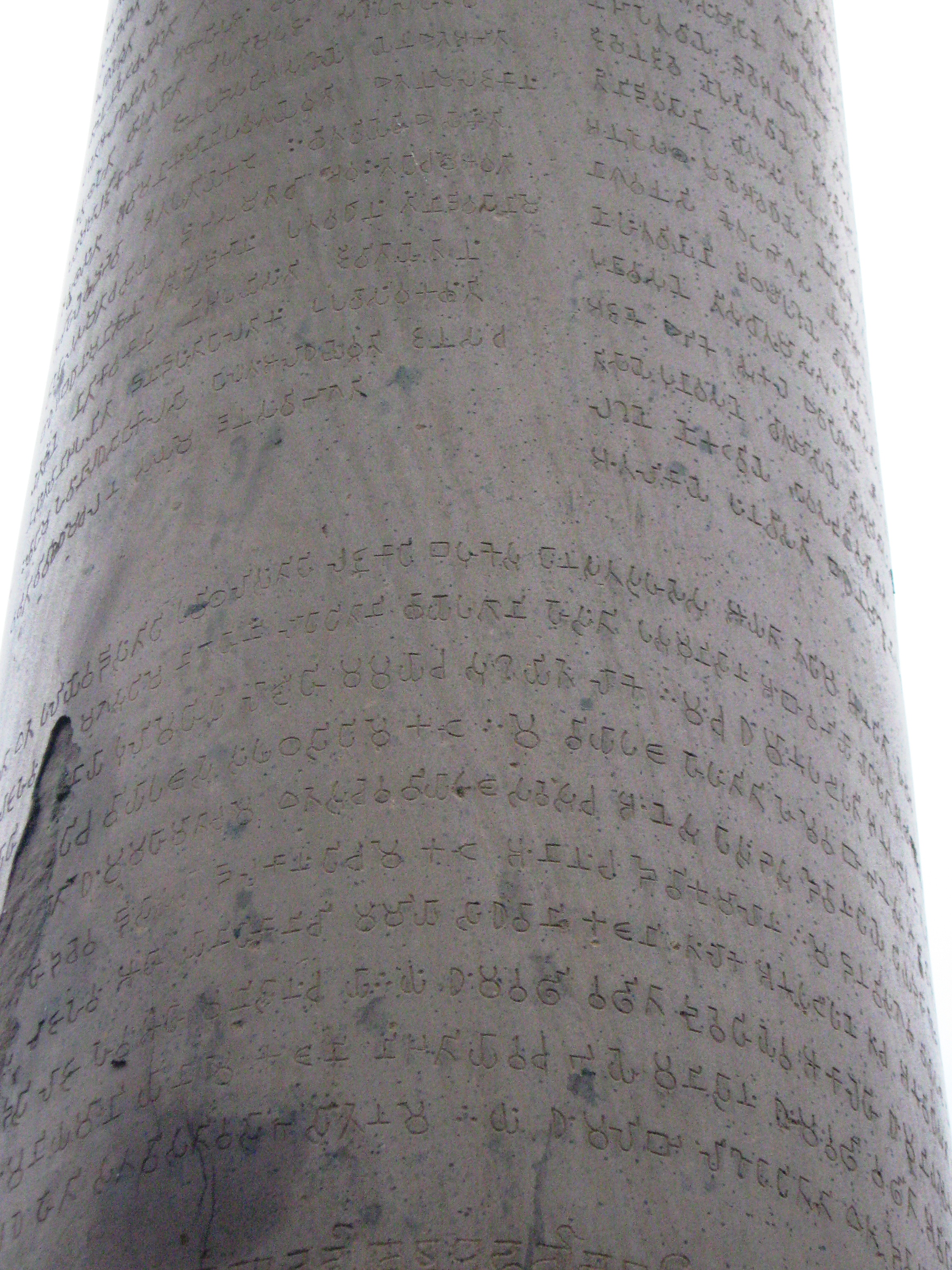
Jain inscription of Ashoka (c. 236 BCE)

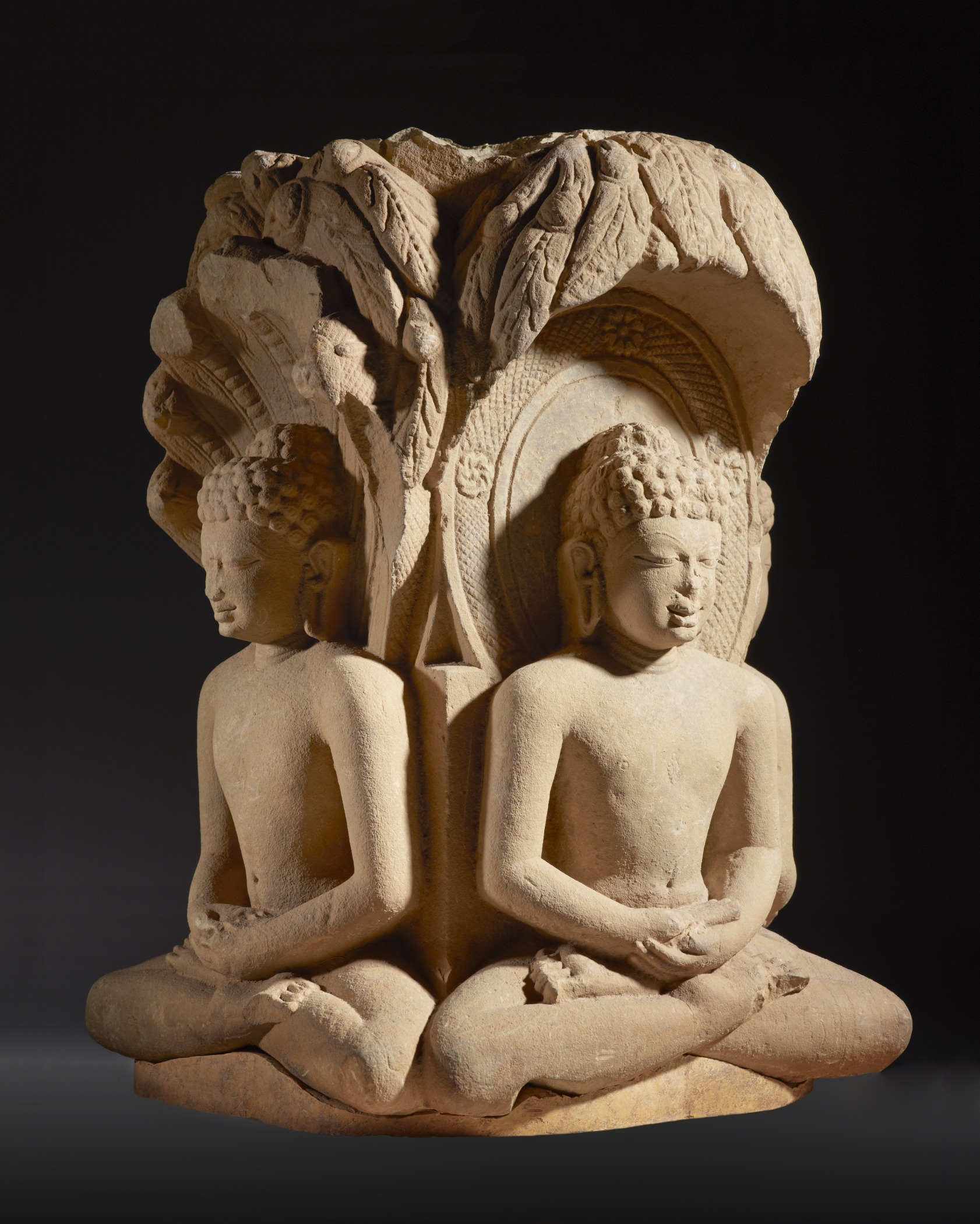
Chaumukha Sculpture with Four Jinas (Rishabhanatha (Adinatha), Parshvanatha, Neminatha, and Mahavira), LACMA, sixth century

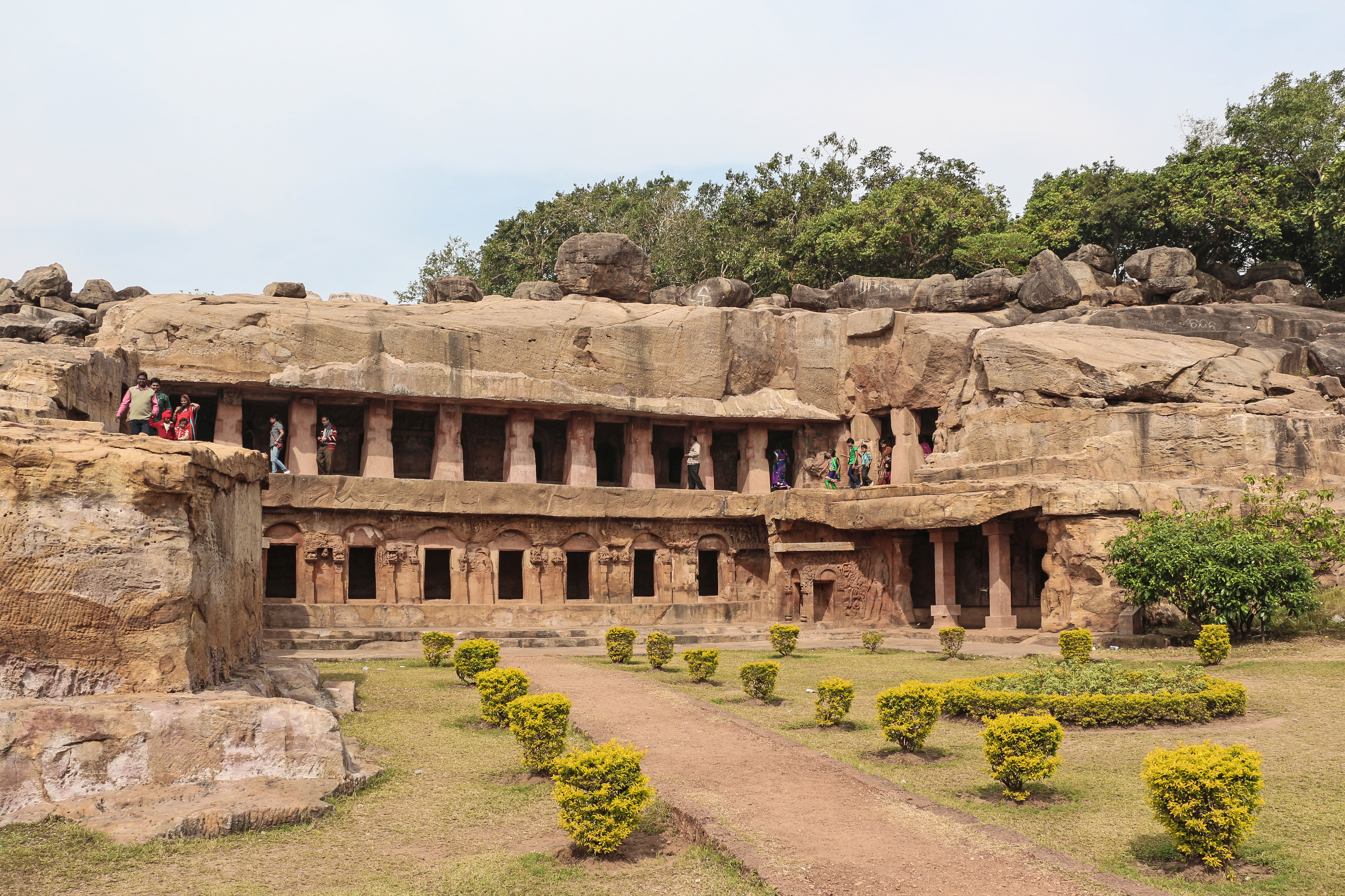
Udayagiri and Khandagiri Caves built by King Kharavela of Mahameghavahana dynasty in second century CE

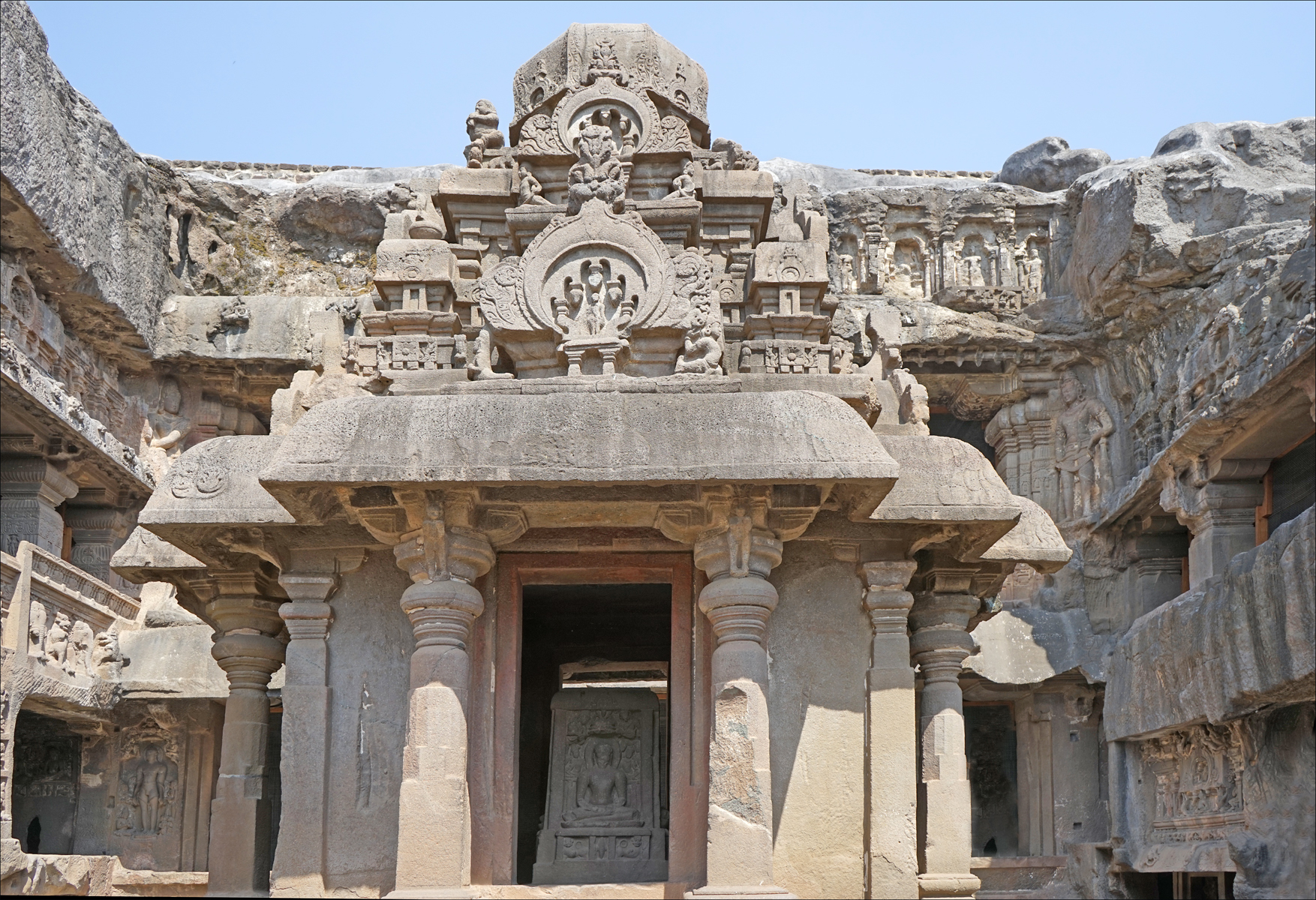
The Indra Sabha cave at the Ellora Caves are co-located with Hindu and Buddhist monuments.

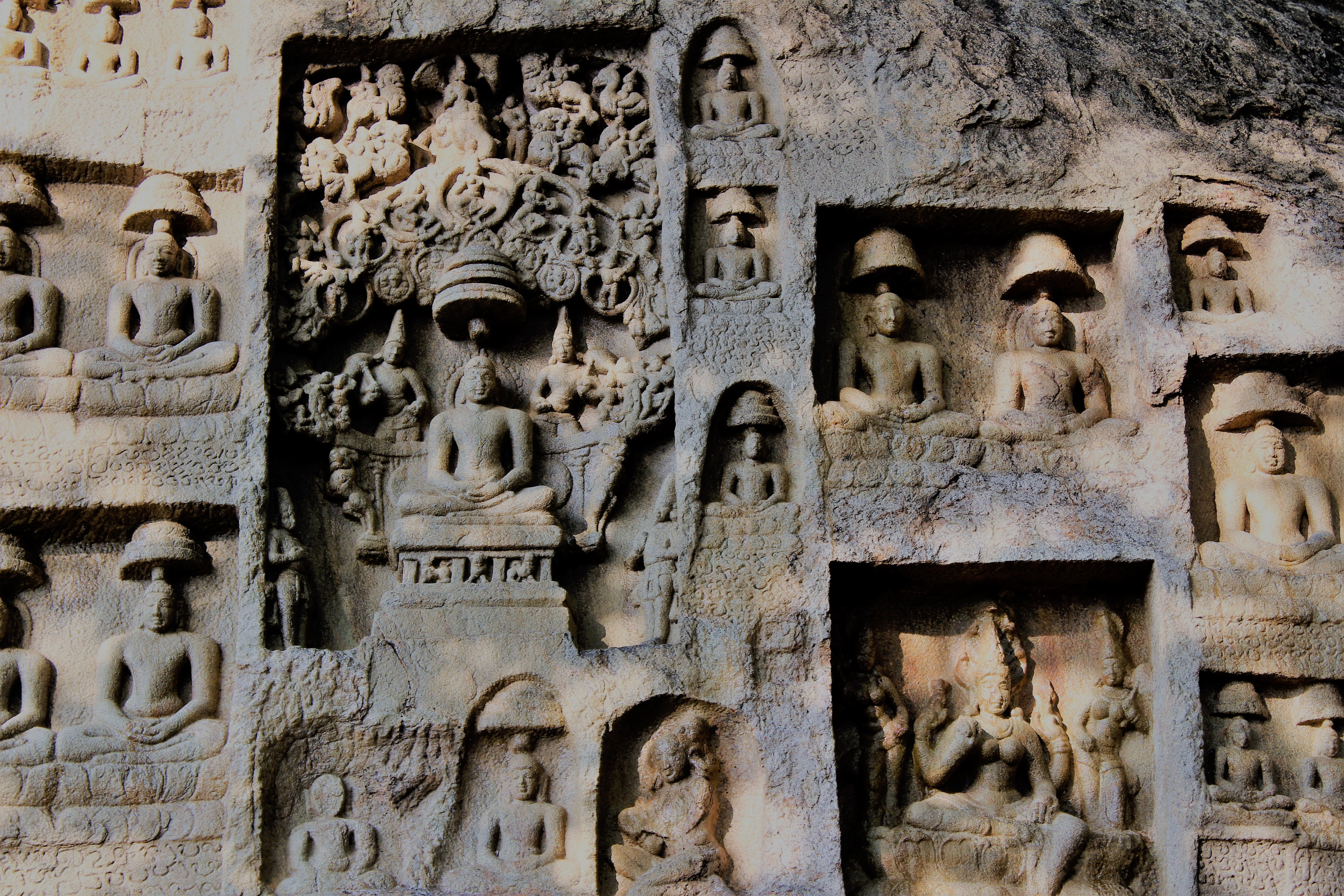
Kazhugumalai Jain beds

=== Medieval patronage and decline ===
Royal patronage has been a key factor in the growth and decline of Jainism. In the second half of the first century CE, Hindu kings of the Rashtrakuta dynasty sponsored major Jain cave temples. King Harshavardhana of the seventh century championed Jainism, Buddhism and all traditions of Hinduism. The Pallava King Mahendravarman I (600–630 CE) converted from Jainism to Shaivism. His work Mattavilasa Prahasana ridicules certain Shaiva sects and the Buddhists and expresses contempt for Jain ascetics. The Yadava dynasty built many temples at the Ellora Caves between 700 and 1000 CE. King Āma of the eighth century converted to Jainism, and the Jain pilgrimage tradition was well established in his era. Mularaja (10th century CE), the founder of the Chalukya dynasty, constructed a Jain temple, even though he was not a Jain. During the 11th century, Basava, a minister to the Jain Kalachuri king Bijjala, converted many Jains to the Lingayat Shaivite sect. The Lingayats destroyed Jain temples and adapted them to their use. The Hoysala King Vishnuvardhana (c. 1108–1152 CE) became a Vaishnavite under the influence of Ramanuja, and Vaishnavism then grew rapidly in what is now Karnataka.

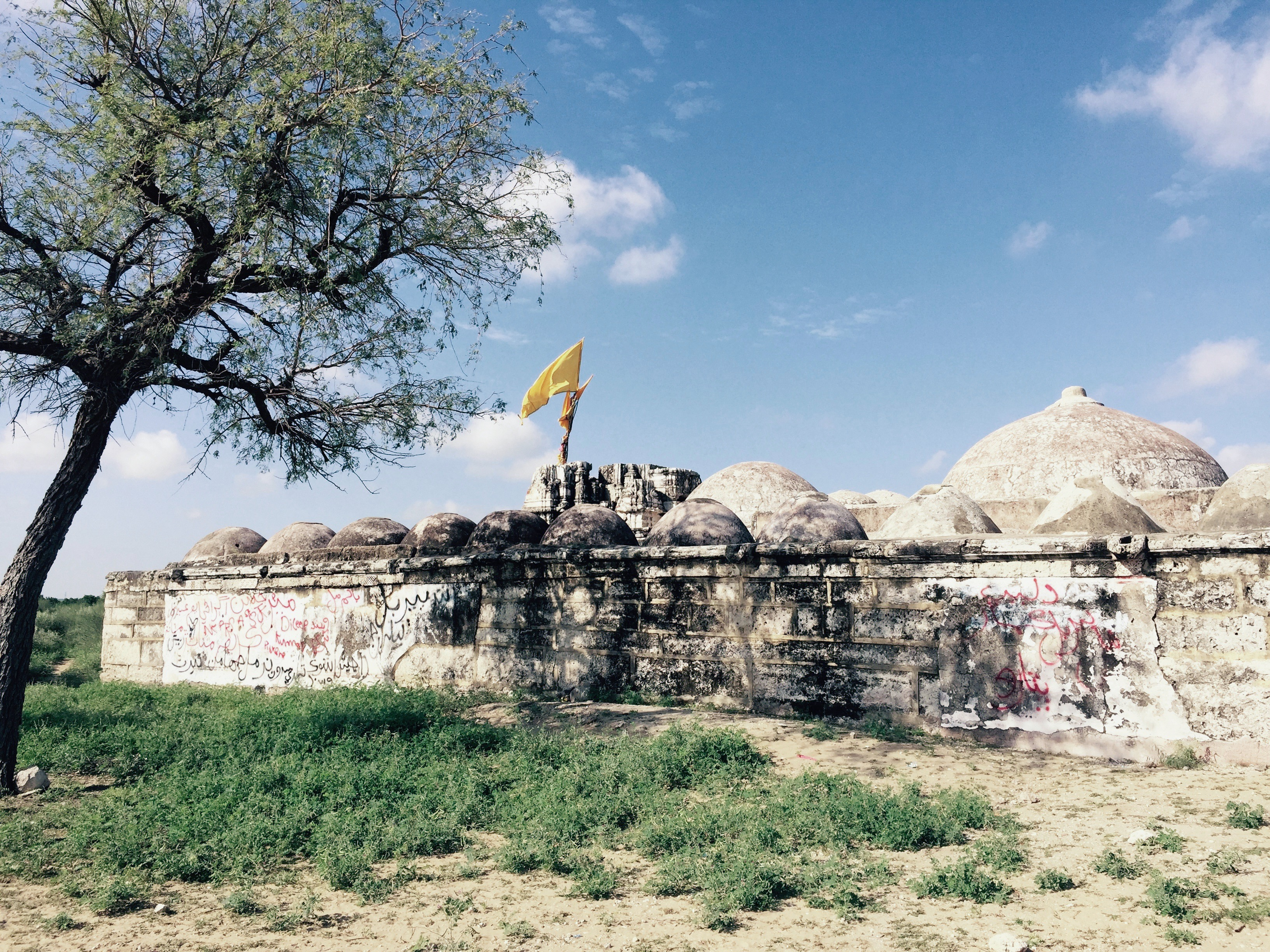
The ruins of Gori Jain temples in Nagarparkar, Pakistan, a pilgrimage site before 1947

Jainism faced persecution during and after the Muslim conquests on the Indian subcontinent. The scholarship in context of Jain relations with the ruler of Delhi Sultanate remains scarce, notwithstanding there were several instances of cordial relations of Jains with prominent rulers of the Sultanate. Alauddin Khalji (1296–1316), as attested by the Jain texts held discussions with Jain sages and once specially summoned Acharya Mahasena to Delhi. One more prominent Jain figure Acharya Ramachandra Suri was also honored by him. During his reign, his governor of Gujarat, Alp Khan permitted the reconstruction of the temples razed during earlier Muslim conquests and himself made huge donation for the renovation of Jain temples. Muhammad bin Tughluq (1325–1351) according to the Jain chronicles favoured the Jain scholars.

The Mughal emperors in general were influenced by the Jain scholars and made patronage and grants for their pilgrimage sites under Humayun (1540–1556), Akbar (1556–1605), Jahangir (1605–1627) and even Aurangzeb (1658–1707). Despite this, there were instances of religious bigotry during the Mughal rule towards Jains. Babur (1526–1530), the first Mughal emperor ordered the destruction of various Jain idols in Gwalior. In 1567, Akbar ravaged the fort of Chittor. After the conquest of the fort, Akbar ordered the destruction of several Jain shrines and temples in Chittor. Similarly there were instances of desecration of Jain religious shrines under Jahangir, Shah Jahan and most notably under Aurangzeb.

The Jain community were the traditional bankers and financiers, and this significantly impacted the Muslim rulers. However, they rarely were a part of the political power during the Islamic rule period of the Indian subcontinent.

=== Colonial era ===
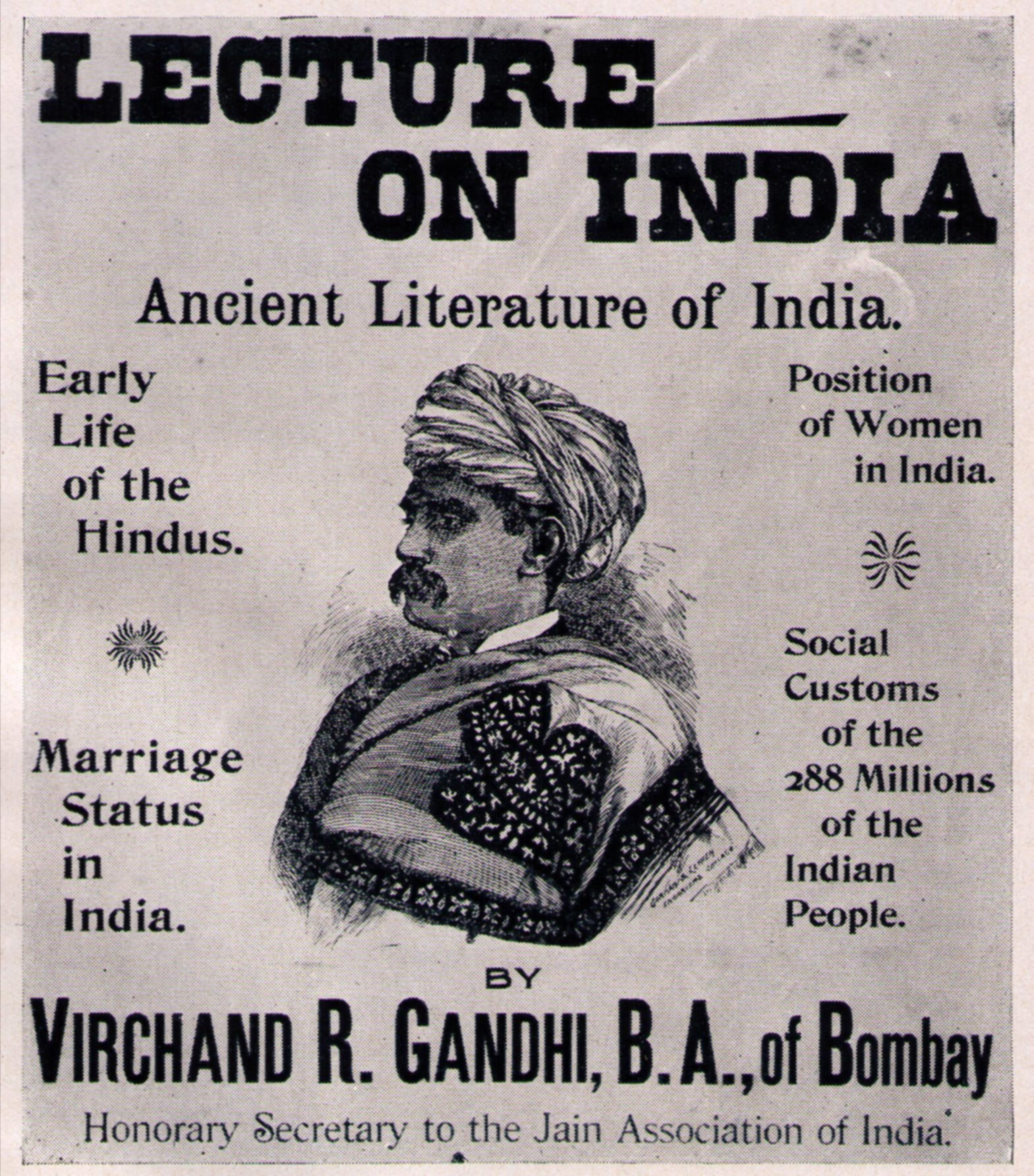
A poster of Virchand Gandhi, who represented Jainism at the Parliament of the World's Religions in Chicago in 1893

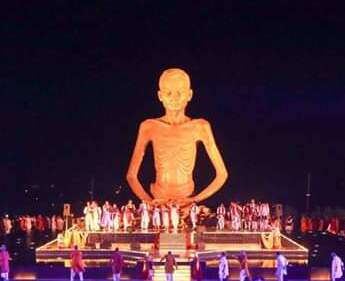
A 10.5-metre (34-foot) tall idol of Shrimad Rajchandra at Dharampur, Valsad

A Gujarati Jain scholar, Virchand Gandhi, represented Jainism at the first World Parliament of Religions in 1893, held in America during the Chicago World's Fair. He worked to defend the rights of Jains and wrote and lectured extensively on Jainism.

Shrimad Rajchandra, a mystic, poet and philosopher from Gujarat is believed to have attained jatismaran gnana (ability to recollect past lives) at the age of seven. Virchand Gandhi mentioned this feat at the Parliament of the World's Religions. He is best known because of his association with Mahatma Gandhi. Shrimad Rajchandra composed Shri Atmasiddhi Shastra, considered his magnum opus, containing the essence of Jainism in a single sitting of 1.5–2 hours. He expounds on the six fundamental truths of the soul:

1. Self (soul) exists
2. It is permanent and eternal
3. It is the doer of its own actions
4. It is the enjoyer or the sufferer of its actions
5. Liberation exists
6. There is a path to achieve liberation.

Colonial era reports and Christian missions variously viewed Jainism as a sect of Hinduism, a sect of Buddhism, or a distinct religion. Christian missionaries were frustrated at Jain people without pagan creator gods refusing to convert to Christianity, while colonial era Jain scholars such as Champat Rai Jain defended Jainism against criticism and misrepresentation by Christian activists. Missionaries of Christianity and Islam considered Jain traditions idolatrous and superstitious. These criticisms, states John E. Cort, were flawed and ignored similar practices within sects of Christianity.

The British colonial government in India and Indian princely states promoted religious tolerance. However, laws were passed that made roaming naked by anyone an arrestable crime. This drew popular support from the majority Hindu population, but particularly impacted Digambara monks. The Akhil Bharatiya Jain Samaj opposed this law, claiming that it interfered with Jain religious rights. Acharya Shantisagar entered Bombay (now Mumbai) in 1927, but was forced to cover his body. He then led an India-wide tour as the naked monk with his followers, to various Digambara sacred sites, and was welcomed by kings of the Maharashtra provinces. Shantisagar fasted to oppose the restrictions imposed on Digambara monks by the British Raj and prompted their discontinuance. The laws were abolished by India after independence.

=== Modern era ===
The texts attributed to Kundakunda inspired two contemporary lay-movements within Jainism with his notion of two truths and his emphasis on direct insight into niścayanaya or 'ultimate perspective', also called "supreme" (paramārtha) and "pure" (śuddha). (Note: According to Long, this view shows influence from Buddhism and Vedanta, which see bondage are arising from avidya, ignorance, and see the ultimate solution to this in a form of spiritual gnosis. Johnson also notes that "his use of a vyavahara/niscaya distinction [...] has more in common with Madhyamaka Buddhism and even more with Advaita Vedanta than with the Jain philosophy of Anekantavada." Cort, referring to Johnson, notes that "a minority position exemplified by Kundakunda has deemphasized conduct and focused upon knowledge alone.")

Shrimad Rajchandra (1867–1901) was a Jain poet and mystic who was inspired by works of Kundakunda and Digambara mystical tradition. Nominally belonging to the Digambara tradition, his followers sometimes consider his teaching as a new path of Jainism, neither Śvetāmbara nor Digambara, and revere him as a saint. His path is sometimes referred as Raj Bhakta Marg, Kavipanth, or Shrimadiya, which has mostly lay followers as was Rajchandra himself. His teachings influenced Kanji Swami, Dada Bhagwan, Rakesh Jhaveri (Shrimad Rajchandra Mission), Saubhagyabhai, Lalluji Maharaj, Atmanandji and several other religious figures.

Kanji Panth is a lay movement founded by Kanji Swami (1890–1980). Nominally it belongs to the Śvetāmbara but is inspired by Kundakunda and Shrimad Rajchandra (1867–1901), though "lacking a place in any Digambara ascetic lineage descending from Kundakunda." Kanji Swami has many followers in the Jain diaspora. They generally regard themselves simply as Digambara Jains, more popularly known as Mumukshu, following the mystical tradition of Kundakunda and Pandit Todarmal.

Bauer notes that "[in] recent years there has been a convergence of the Kanji Swami Panth and the Shrimad Rajcandra movement, part of trend toward a more eucumenical and less sectarian Jainism among educated, mobile Jains living overseas."

The Akram Vignan Movement established by Dada Bhagwan draws inspiration from teachings of Rajchandra and other Jain scriptures, though it is considered as a Jain-Vaishnava Hindu syncretistic movement.

Greatly influenced by Shrimad Rajchandra, the leader of the campaign for Indian independence, Mahatma Gandhi stated regarding Jainism:

No religion in the World has explained the principle of Ahiṃsā so deeply and systematically as is discussed with its applicability in every human life in Jainism. As and when the benevolent principle of Ahiṃsā or non-violence will be ascribed for practice by the people of the world to achieve their end of life in this world and beyond, Jainism is sure to have the uppermost status and Mahāvīra is sure to be respected as the greatest authority on Ahiṃsā.

Chandanaji became the first Jain woman to receive the title of Acharya in 1987.

== Sects and traditions ==
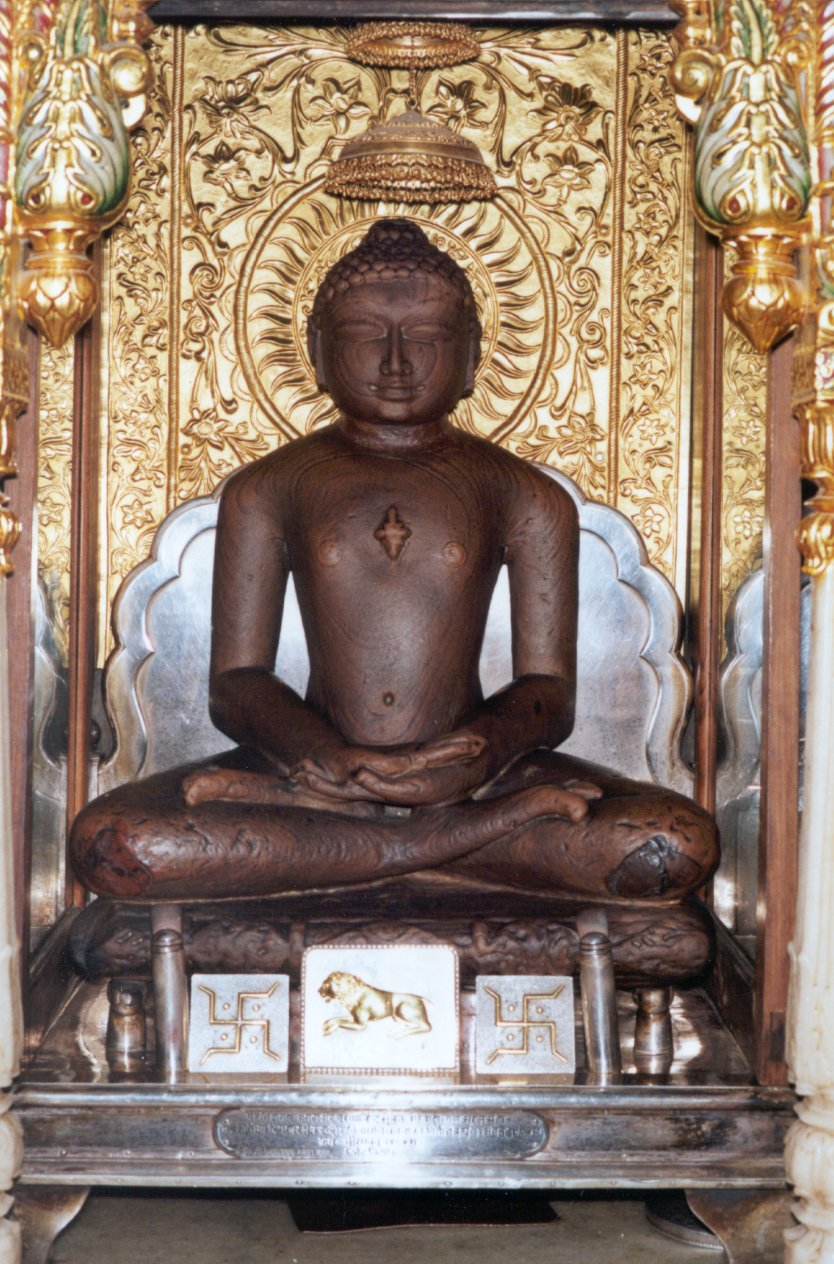
Digambara Mahāvīra iconography

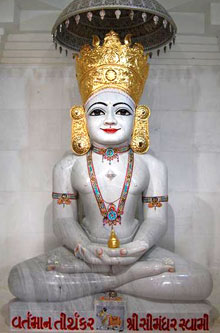
Śvētāmbara Simandhar Swami iconography

The Jain community is divided into two major denominations, Digambara and Śvētāmbara. This schism is ancient and centers on differing monastic disciplines, canonical scriptures, and core doctrines (such as the liberation of women).

- The Digambara (sky-clad) tradition holds that male monks must renounce all possessions, including clothes, to practice achailakya (nudity). Female monastics, known as Aryikas, wear unstitched plain white sarees.
- The Śvētāmbara (white-clad) tradition holds that monastics, both male and female, may wear simple, seamless white robes (sachailakya).

=== The Great Schism: traditional accounts ===
The Digambara tradition places the origin of the schism around the 4th century BCE. According to their account, Acharya Bhadrabahu predicted a twelve-year famine in Magadha and led a migration of monks to Karnataka. Sthulabhadra, a pupil, remained behind with other monks. The Digambara tradition holds that Sthulabhadra's northern group relaxed the original practice of nudity and began wearing white clothes, which was unacceptable to the returning monks who had preserved the mūla sangha (original community). In this view, the Digambaras preserved the original achailakya (nude) practice of Mahavira, while the Svetambaras adopted a more lax, clothed practice. The earliest record of Digambara beliefs is contained in the Prakrit Suttapahuda of Kundakunda.

The Svetambara tradition, in texts like the Viśeṣāvaśyaka Bhāṣya (5th cent. CE), places the schism much later. Their account states the Digambara sect arose 609 years after Mahavira's nirvana (c. 1st–2nd cent. CE), founded by a monk named Sivabhuti. The narrative states that Sivabhuti, in a "fit of pique", adopted nudity, which his original tradition rejected. Svetambara texts accuse this new sect of "eight concealments", including the rejection of the canonical texts preserved by their tradition and the new doctrine that women could not attain liberation. The Śvētāmbara tradition in turn has two sub-traditions: Deravasi, also known as Mandirmargis, and Sthānakavāsī.

=== Scholarly analysis and solidification ===
Most modern scholars, such as Padmanabh Jaini and Paul Dundas, conclude that the schism was not a single "event" but a gradual hardening of differences over several centuries. Monastic nudity and the wearing of robes likely co-existed as acceptable monastic options for some time. Archaeological evidence from Mathura, for instance, shows nude tirthankara images from the Kushan Empire (c. 1st century CE).

The definitive, formal split is often associated with the Council of Vallabhi in the 5th century CE. This council was organized by the Svetambara tradition to formally codify their canonical scriptures (the Agamas). The Digambara tradition, which had its own (and different) scriptural canon, did not attend and rejected the authenticity of these texts, solidifying the schism.

=== Key doctrinal and practical differences ===
Digambaras and Śvētāmbara differ in their practices and dress code, interpretations of teachings, and on Jain history especially concerning the tirthankaras. Their monasticism rules differ, as does their iconography. Śvētāmbara has had more female than male mendicants, where Digambara has mostly had male monks and considers males closest to the soul's liberation. The Śvētāmbaras believe that women can also achieve liberation through asceticism and state that the 19th Tirthankara Māllīnātha was female, which Digambara rejects. Early Jain images from Mathura depict Digambara iconography until late fifth century CE where Svetambara iconography starts appearing.

Several scholars and scriptures of other religions as well as those of their counterpart Śvetāmbara Jains criticize Digambara sect's practices of public nudity as well as their belief that women are incapable of attaining spiritual liberation.

Excavations at Mathura revealed Jain statues from the time of the Kushan Empire (c. 1st century CE). Tirthankara represented without clothes, and monks with cloth wrapped around the left arm, are identified as the Ardhaphalaka (half-clothed) mentioned in texts. The Yapaniyas, believed to have originated from the Ardhaphalaka, followed Digambara nudity along with several Śvētāmbara beliefs. In the modern era, according to Flügel, new Jain religious movements that are a "primarily devotional form of Jainism" have developed which resemble "Jain Mahayana" style devotionalism.

== Practices ==
=== The Four-Fold Community (Caturvidha Saṅgha) ===
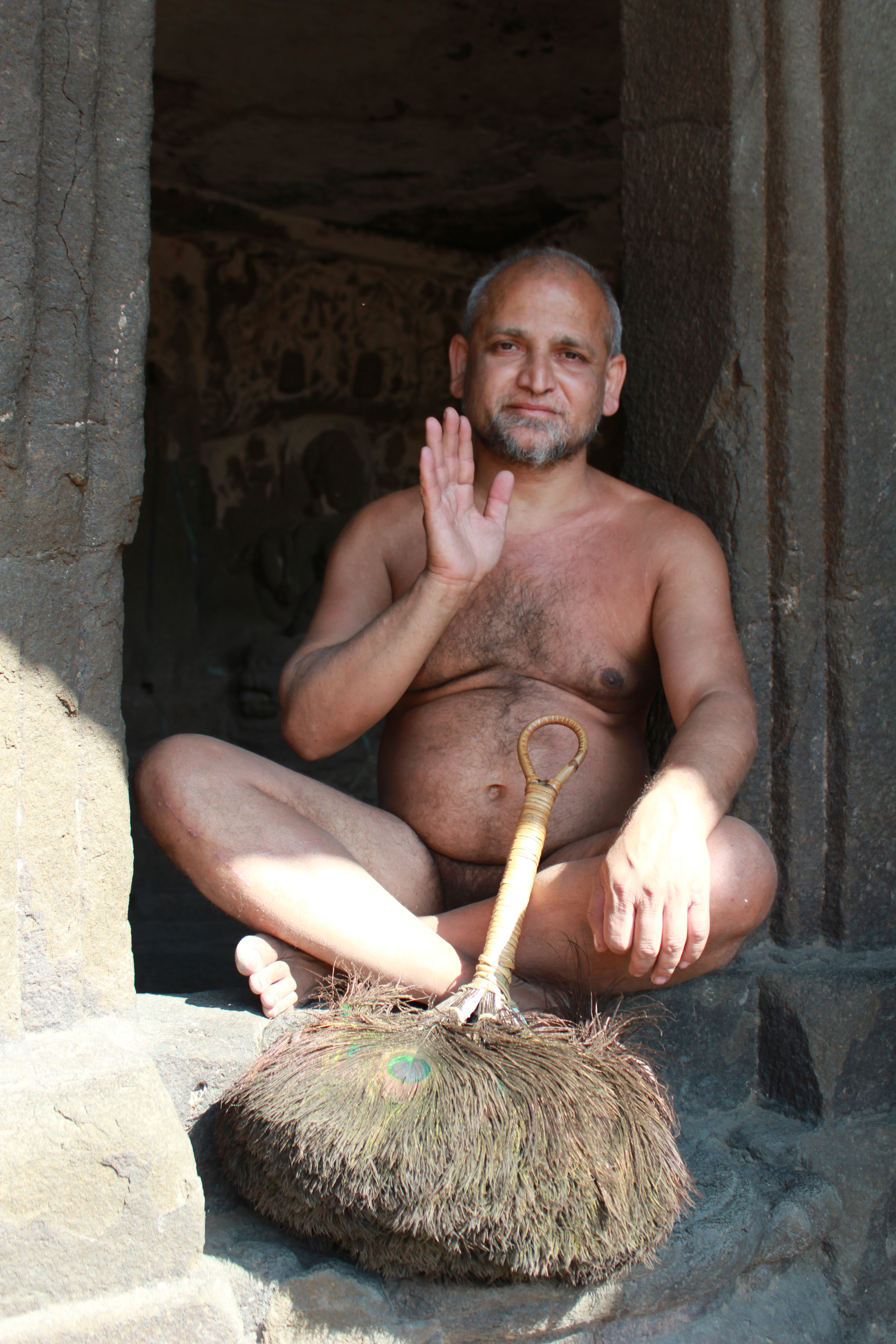
Digambara sadhu (monk)

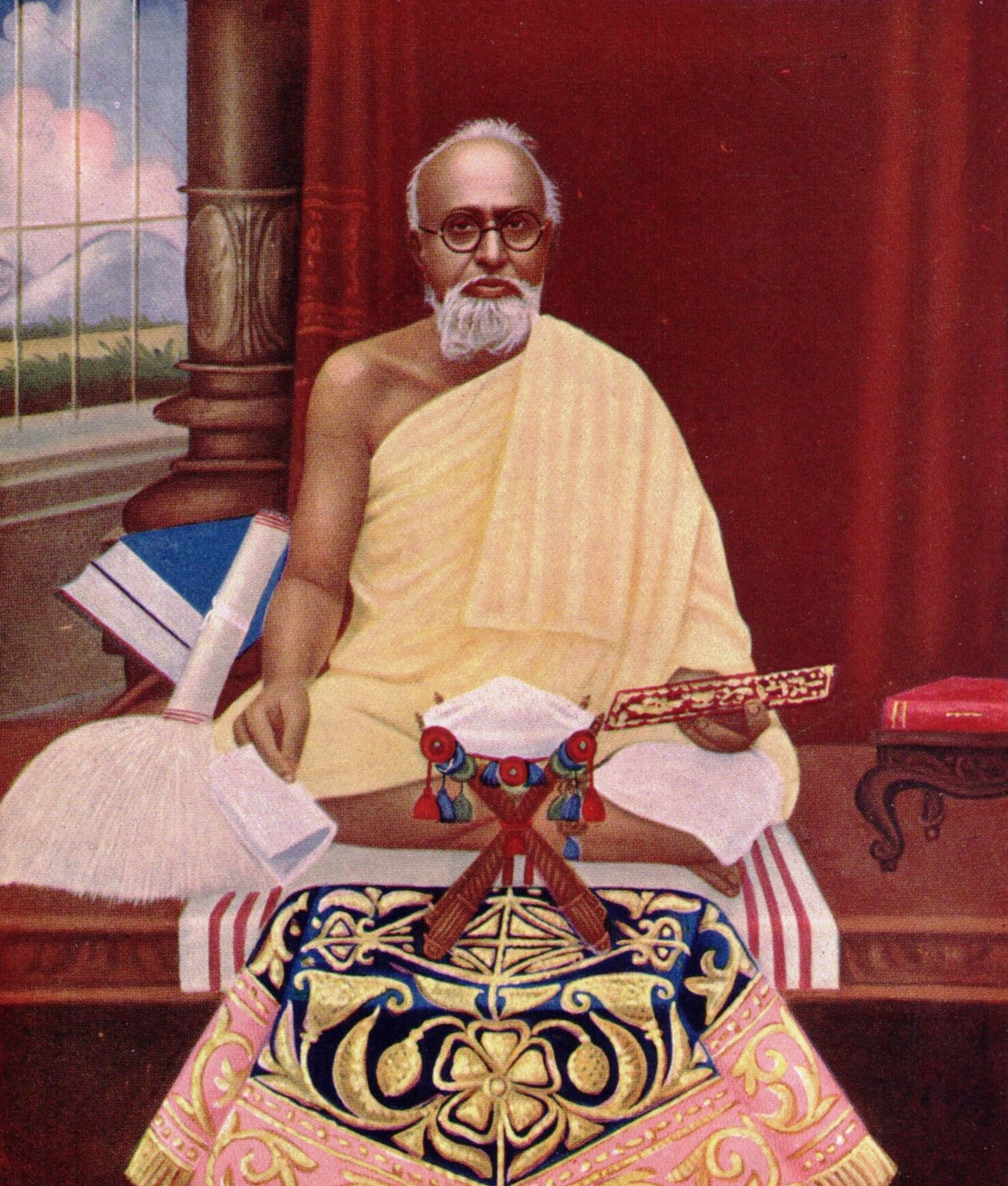
Śvētāmbara-Deravasi sadhu (monk)

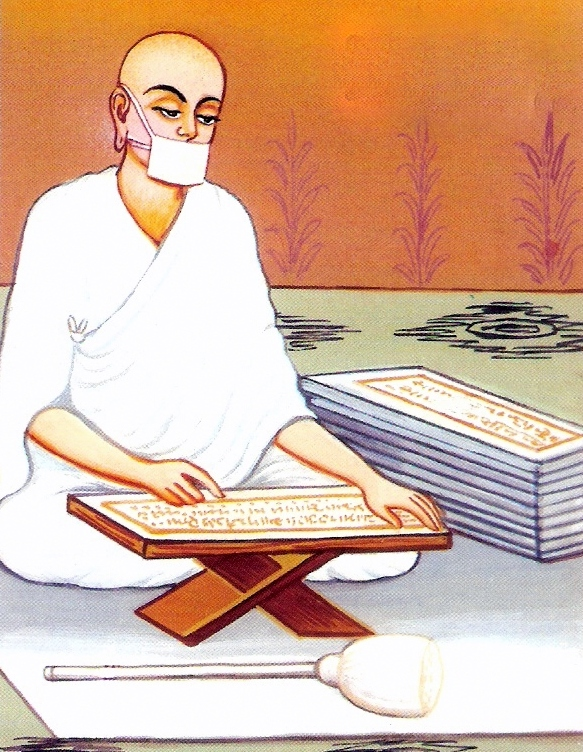
Śvētāmbara-Sthanakwasi sadhu (monk)

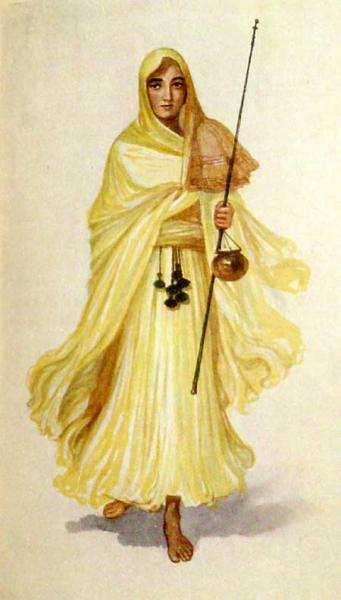
A Śvētāmbara sadhvi (nun)(early 20th-century)

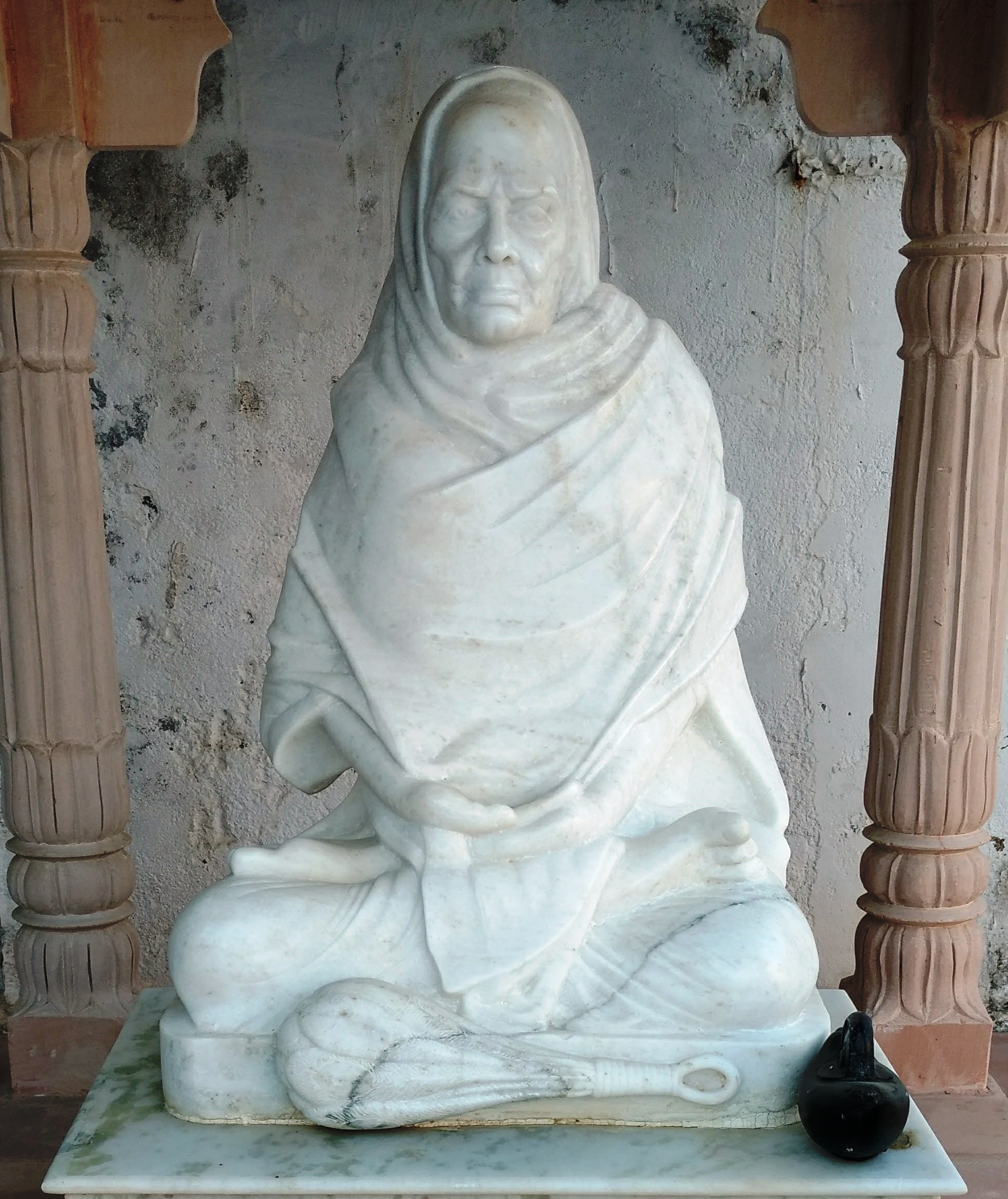
A Digambara sadhvi (nun)

Of the major Indian religions, Jainism has had the strongest ascetic tradition. Ascetic life may include nakedness, symbolizing non-possession even of clothes, fasting, body mortification, and penance, to burn away past karma and stop producing new karma, both of which are believed essential for reaching siddha and moksha ("liberation from rebirths" and "salvation").

Jain texts like Tattvartha Sūtra and Uttaradhyayana Sūtra discuss austerities in detail. Six outer and six inner practices are oft-repeated in later Jain texts. Outer austerities include complete fasting, eating limited amounts, eating restricted items, abstaining from tasty foods, mortifying the flesh, and guarding the flesh (avoiding anything that is a source of temptation). Inner austerities include expiation, confession, respecting and assisting mendicants, studying, meditation, and ignoring bodily wants in order to abandon the body. Lists of internal and external austerities vary with the text and tradition. Asceticism is viewed as a means to control desires, and to purify the jiva (soul). According to tradition, the tirthankaras such as the Mahāvīra (Vardhamana) set an example by performing severe austerities for twelve years.

Monastic organization, sangh, has a four-fold order consisting of sadhu (male ascetics, muni), sadhvi (female ascetics, aryika), śrāvaka (laymen), and śrāvikā (laywomen). The latter two support the ascetics and their monastic organizations called gacch or samuday, in autonomous regional Jain congregations. Jain monastic rules have encouraged the use of mouth cover, as well as the Dandasan—a long stick with woolen threads—to gently remove ants and insects that may come in their path.

In Jainism, six essential duties (avashyakas) are prescribed for śrāvakas (householders). The six duties are:

1. Worship of Pañca-Parameṣṭhi (five supreme beings)
2. Following the preachings of Jain saints.
3. Study of Jain scriptures
4. Samayika: practising serenity and meditation
5. Following discipline in their daily engagement
6. Charity (dāna) of four kinds:
  1. Ahara-dāna- donation of food
  2. Ausadha-dāna- donation of medicine
  3. Jnana-dāna- donation of knowledge
  4. Abhaya-dāna- saving the life of a living being or giving of protection to someone under threat

These duties became fundamental ritual activities of a Jain householder. Such as spreading the grain for the birds in the morning, and filtering or boiling the water for the next few hours' use became ritual acts of charity and non-violence. Samayika was used as a word for all spiritual activity including icon worship during medieval times.

=== Ahimsa in practice: Jain diet ===
The practice of nonviolence toward all living beings has led to Jain culture being vegetarian. Devout Jains practice lacto-vegetarianism, meaning that they eat no eggs, but accept dairy products if their production involved no violence to animals. Veganism is encouraged if there are concerns about animal welfare. Jain monks, nuns, and some followers avoid root vegetables such as potatoes, onions, and garlic because tiny organisms are injured when the plant is pulled up, and because a bulb or tuber's ability to sprout is seen as characteristic of a higher living being. (Note: In Jainism, the ahiṃsā precept for a mendicant requires avoidance of touching or disturbing any living being including plants. It also mandates never swimming in water, nor lighting or fire or extinguish one, nor thrashing arms in the air as such actions can torment or hurt other beings that live in those states of matter.) Jain monks and advanced laypeople avoid eating after sunset, observing a vow of ratri-bhojana-tyaga-vrata. Monks observe a stricter vow by eating only once a day.

Jains fast particularly during festivals. This practice is called upavasa, tapasya or vrata, and may be practiced according to one's ability. Digambaras fast for Dasa-laksana-parvan, eating only one or two meals per day, drinking only boiled water for ten days, or fasting completely on the first and last days of the festival, mimicking the practices of a Jain mendicant for the period. Śvētāmbara Jains do similarly in the eight day paryusana with samvatsari-pratikramana. The practice is believed to remove karma from one's soul and provides merit (punya). A "one-day" fast lasts about 36 hours, starting at sunset before the day of the fast and ending 48 minutes after sunrise the day after. Among laypeople, fasting is more commonly observed by women, as it shows their piety and religious purity, gains merit earning and helps ensure future well-being for their family. Some religious fasts are observed in a social and supportive female group. Long fasts are celebrated by friends and families with special ceremonies.

=== Meditation - sāmāyika ===
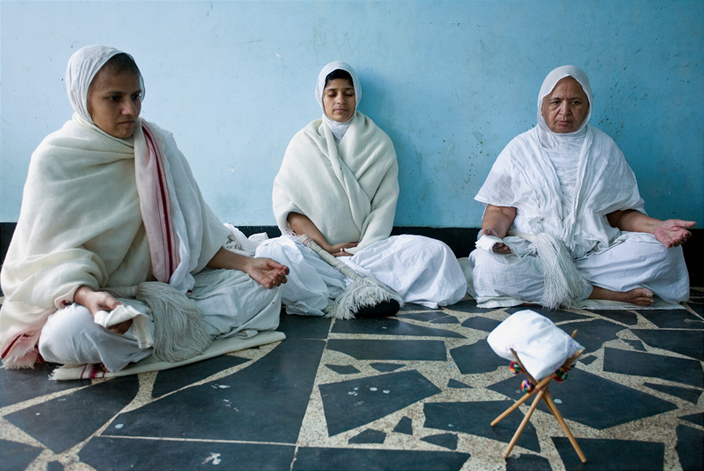
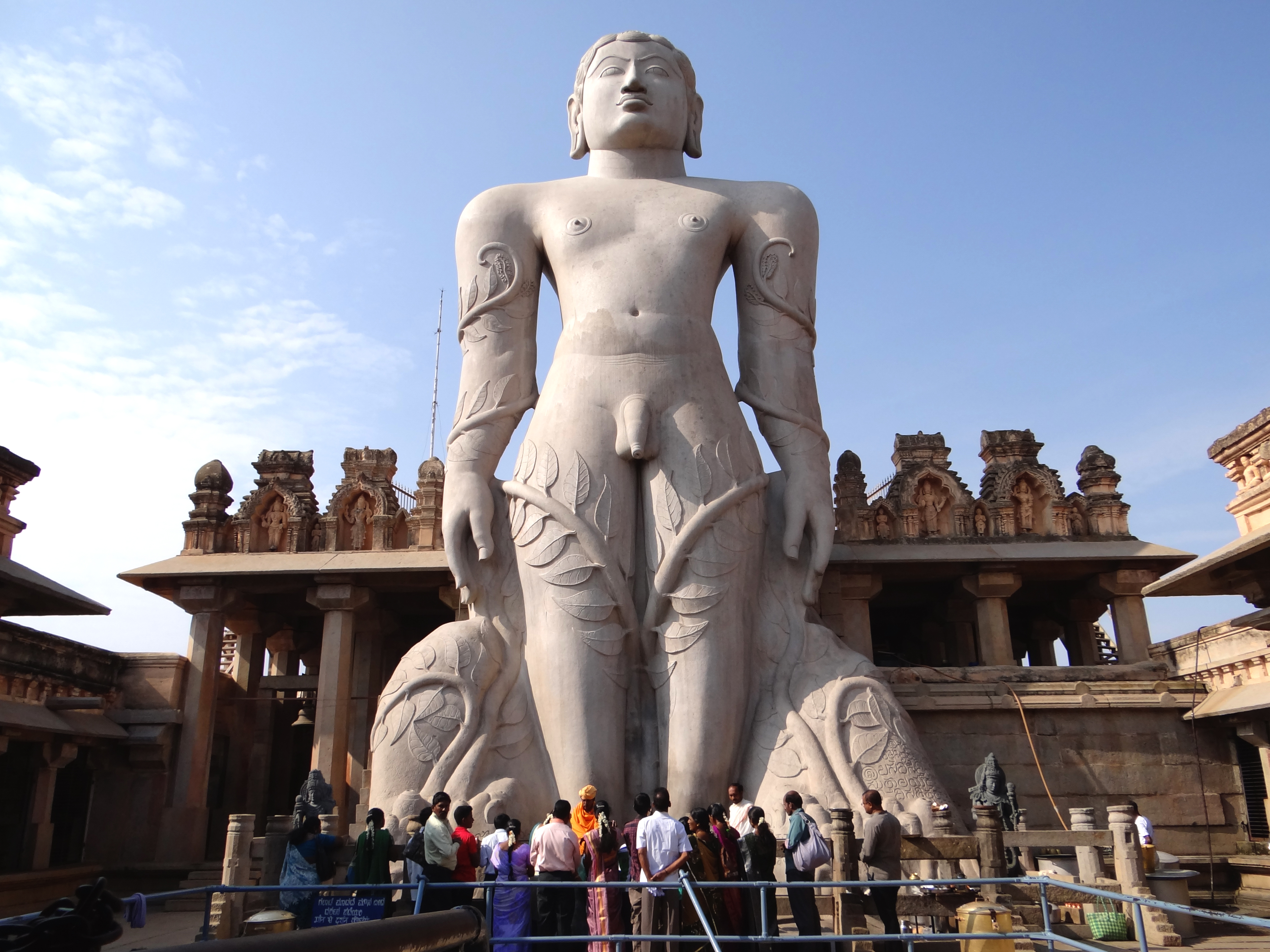
Left: Jain nuns meditating, Right: 10th-century Gommateshwara statue depicting standing meditation (Kayotsarga posture)

Jainism considers meditation (dhyana) a necessary practice, but it never has been a central practice. In Jainism, meditation is concerned more with stopping karmic attachments and activity, not as a means to transformational insights or self-realization in other Indian religions.

According to Padmanabh Jaini, Sāmāyika is a practice of "brief periods in meditation" in Jainism that is a part of siksavrata (ritual restraint). The goal of Sāmāyika is to achieve equanimity, and it is the second siksavrata. (Note: The first is desavakasika (staying in a restrained surrounding, cutting down worldly activities). The third is posadhopavasa (fasting on the 8th and 14th days on lunar waxing and waning cycles). The fourth is dana (giving alms to Jain monks, nuns or spiritual people).) The samayika ritual is practiced at least three times a day by mendicants, while a layperson includes it with other ritual practices such as Puja in a Jain temple and doing charity work. According to Johnson, as well as Jaini, samayika connotes more than meditation, and for a Jain householder is the voluntary ritual practice of "assuming temporary ascetic status". (Note: According to Dundas, samayika seems to have meant "correct behavior" in early Jainism.)

=== Temple rituals and physical worship ===
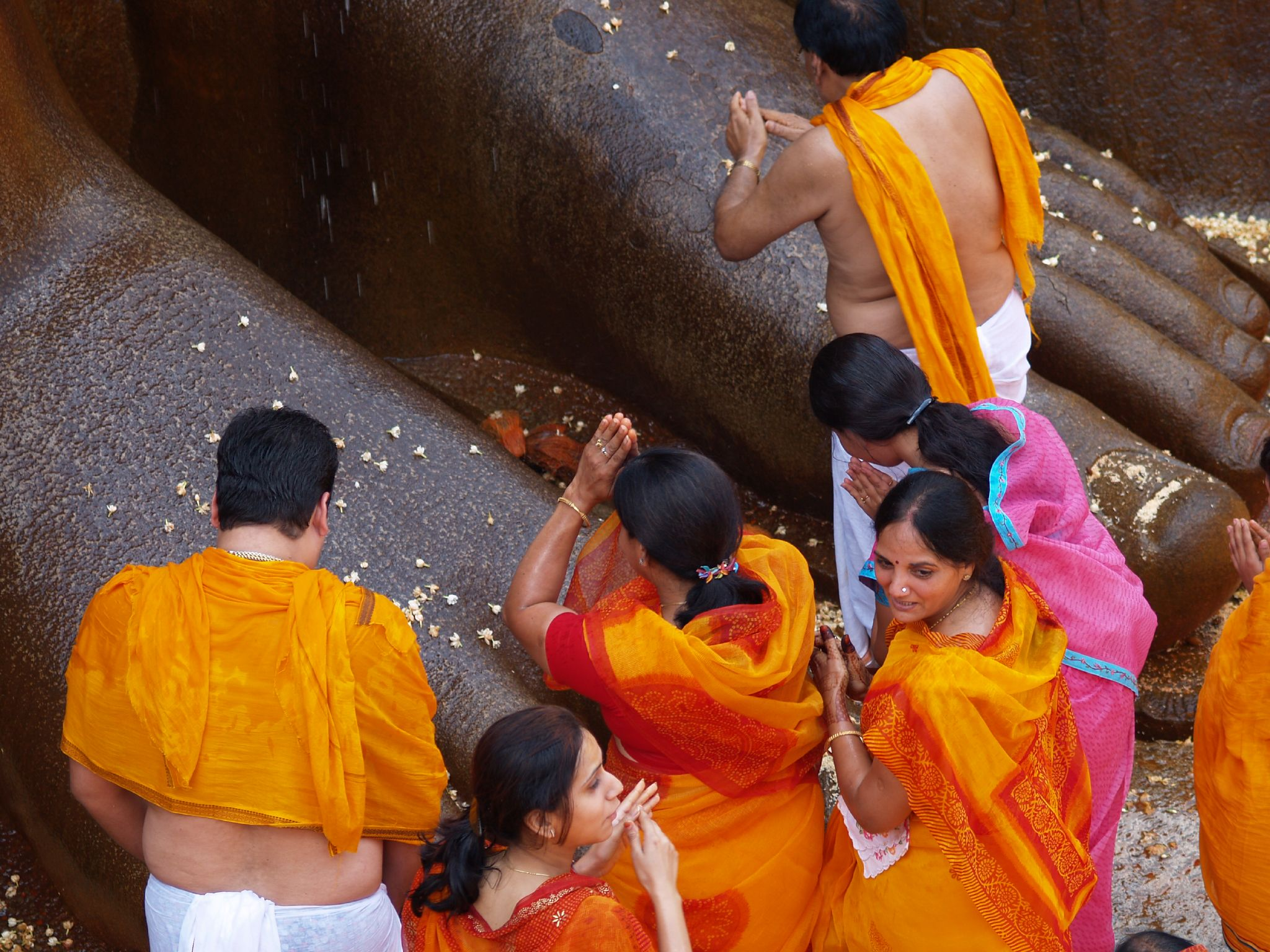
Praying at the feet of a statue of Bahubali

There are many rituals in Jainism's various sects. According to Dundas, the ritualistic lay path among Śvētāmbara Jains is "heavily imbued with ascetic values", where the rituals either revere or celebrate the ascetic life of tirthankaras, or progressively approach the psychological and physical life of an ascetic. The ultimate ritual is sallekhana, a religious death through ascetic abandonment of food and drinks. The Digambara Jains follow the same theme, but the life cycle and religious rituals are closer to a Hindu liturgy. The overlap is mainly in the life cycle (rites-of-passage) rituals, and likely developed because Jain and Hindu societies overlapped, and rituals were viewed as necessary and secular.

Jains ritually worship numerous deities, especially the Jinas. In Jainism a Jina as deva is not an avatar (incarnation), but the highest state of omniscience that an ascetic tirthankara achieved. Out of the 24 tirthankaras, Jains predominantly worship four: Mahāvīra, Parshvanatha, Neminatha and Rishabhanatha. Among the non-tirthankara saints, devotional worship is common for Bahubali among the Digambaras. The Panch Kalyanaka rituals remember the five life events of the tirthankaras, including the Panch Kalyanaka Pratishtha Mahotsava, Panch Kalyanaka Puja and Snatrapuja.

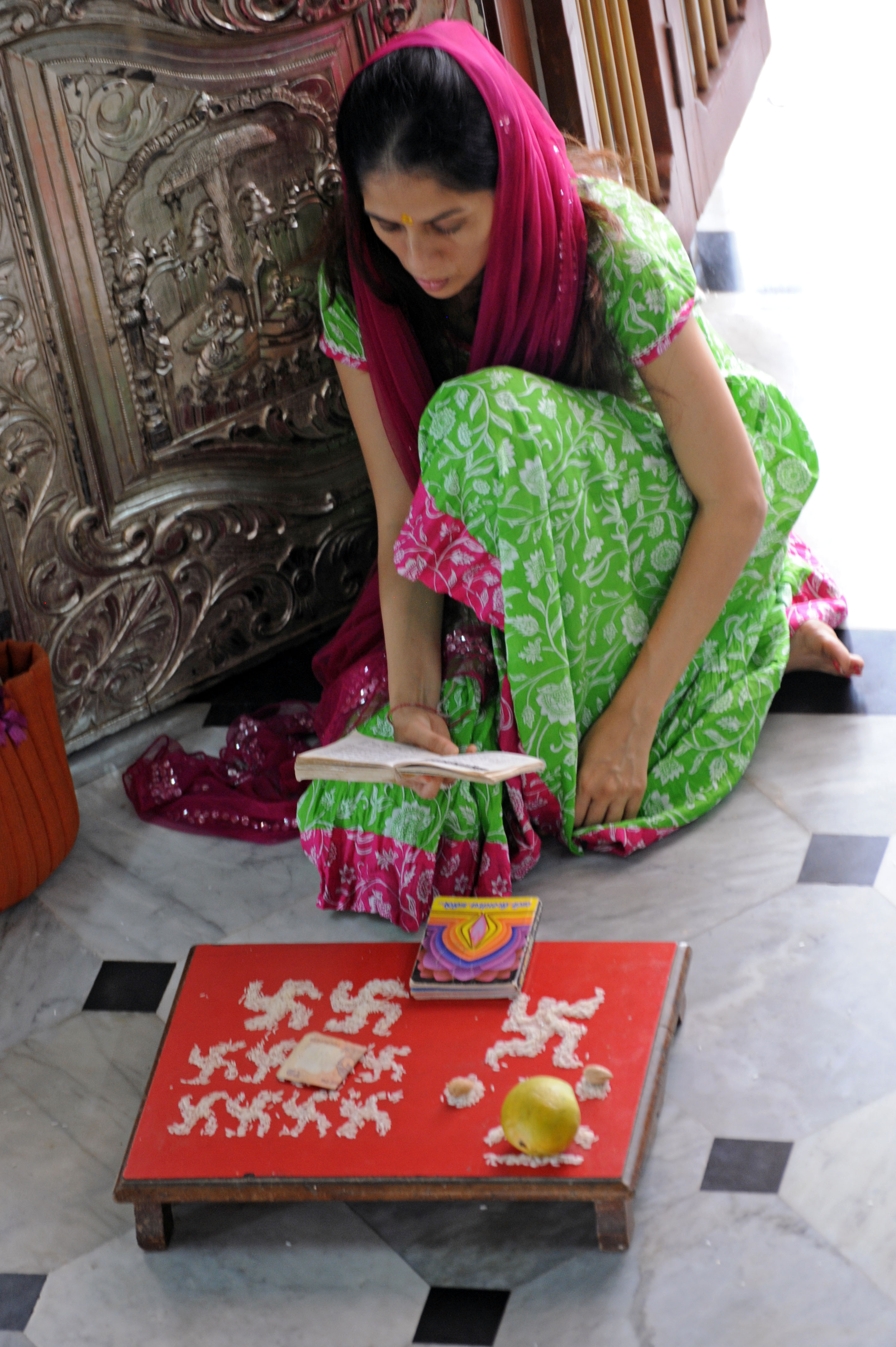
Jain worship may include ritual offerings and recitals.

The basic ritual is darsana (seeing) of deva, which includes Jina, or other yaksas, gods and goddesses such as Brahmadeva, 52 Viras, Padmavati, Ambika and 16 Vidyadevis (including Sarasvati and Lakshmi). Terapanthi Digambaras limit their ritual worship to tirthankaras. The worship ritual is called devapuja, and is found in all Jain sub-traditions. Typically, the Jain layperson enters the Derasar (Jain temple) inner sanctum in simple clothing and bare feet with a plate filled with offerings, bows down, says the namaskar, completes his or her litany and prayers, sometimes is assisted by the temple priest, leaves the offerings and then departs.

Jain practices include performing abhisheka (ceremonial bath) of the images. Some Jain sects employ a pujari (also called upadhye), who may be a Hindu, to perform priestly duties at the temple. More elaborate worship includes offerings such as rice, fresh and dry fruits, flowers, coconut, sweets, and money. Some may light up a lamp with camphor and make auspicious marks with sandalwood paste. Devotees also recite Jain texts, particularly the life stories of the tirthankaras.

=== Mantras, hymns, and vernacular devotion ===
Traditional Jains believe in the spiritual efficacy of mantras and recited devotion (bhakti). The most fundamental invocation, universally accepted across all Jain sects, is the Namokar Mantra (or Pañca-Namaskāra which means five homages). Epigraphic evidence of this mantra's antiquity is found in the Hathigumpha inscription of Emperor Kharavela (c. 2nd or 1st century BCE), which opens with a variation of this foundational homage. This prayer pays respect to the five supreme spiritual beings (Pañca-Parameṣṭhi) rather than petitioning for worldly favors, and is believed to be eternal.

Beyond foundational mantras, medieval Jainism developed a rich tradition of classical Sanskrit and Prakrit hymns (stotras). A premier historical example is the 7th-century Bhaktāmara Stotra, composed by Manatunga. The historical significance and mantric power associated with Manatunga's composition are physically memorialized in epigraphy, notably within the 1128 CE Mallishena Epitaph at Shravanabelagola, which records the legend of his chains miraculously breaking upon reciting the hymn. This classical poetry is recited daily by both Śvetāmbara and Digambara laypersons for profound devotion and mantric healing. Later medieval worship practices also integrated tantric traditions, utilizing diagrams such as the Rishi-mandala to link specific mantras to the tirthankaras and guardian deities to accrue spiritual merit.

In modern practice, Jain lay worship has incorporated vernacular formats that structurally resemble regional Hindu liturgy. These include Aarti (the singing of hymns accompanied by the waving of lamps) and Chalisa (forty-verse devotional poems). However, Indologists note that Jains strictly direct these vernacular prayers toward the ascetic tirthankaras to cultivate spiritual detachment and emulate their path, rather than worshiping them as creator deities who can grant boons.

=== Festivals ===
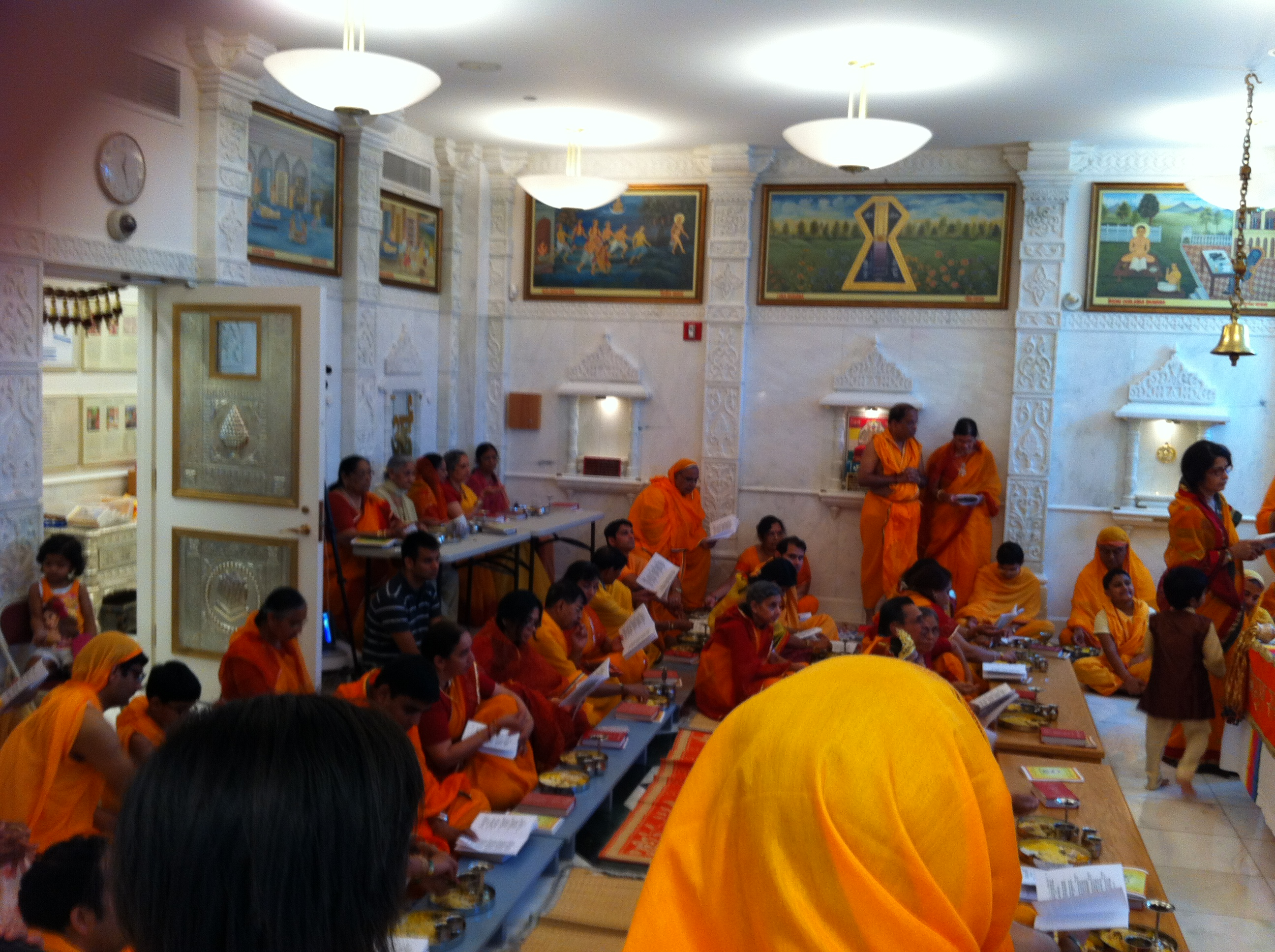
Celebrating Das Lakshana (Paryushana), Jain Center of America, New York City

The most important annual Jain festival is called the Paryushana by Svetambaras and Dasa lakshana parva by the Digambaras. It is celebrated from the 12th day of the waning moon in the traditional lunisolar month of Bhadrapada in the Indian calendar. This typically falls in August or September of the Gregorian calendar. It lasts eight days for Svetambaras, and ten days among the Digambaras. It is a time when lay people fast and pray. The five vows are emphasized during this time. Svetambaras recite the Kalpasūtras, while Digambaras read their own texts. The festival is an occasion where Jains make active effort to stop cruelty towards other life forms, freeing animals in captivity and preventing the slaughter of animals.

Forgiveness

I forgive all living beings,
may all living beings forgive me.
All in this world are my friends,
I have no enemies.

— Jain festival prayer on the last day

The last day involves a focused prayer and meditation session known as Samvatsari. Jains consider this a day of atonement, granting forgiveness to others, seeking forgiveness from all living beings, physically or mentally asking for forgiveness and resolving to treat everyone in the world as friends. Forgiveness is asked by saying "Micchami Dukkadam" or "Khamat khamna" to others. This means, "If I have offended you in any way, knowingly or unknowingly, in thought, word or action, then I seek your forgiveness." The literal meaning of Paryushana is "abiding" or "coming together".

Mahavir Janma Kalyanak celebrates the birth of Mahāvīra. It is celebrated on the 13th day of the lunisolar month of Chaitra in the traditional Indian calendar. This typically falls in March or April of the Gregorian calendar. The festivities include visiting Jain temples, pilgrimages to shrines, reading Jain texts and processions of Mahāvīra by the community. At his legendary birthplace of Kundagrama in Bihar, north of Patna, special events are held by Jains. The next day of Dipawali is observed by Jains as the anniversary of Mahāvīra's attainment of moksha. The Hindu festival of Diwali is also celebrated on the same date (Kartika Amavasya). Jain temples, homes, offices, and shops are decorated with lights and diyas (small oil lamps). The lights are symbolic of knowledge or removal of ignorance. Sweets are often distributed. On Diwali morning, Nirvan Ladoo is offered after praying to Mahāvīra in all Jain temples across the world. The Jain new year starts right after Diwali. Some other festivals celebrated by Jains are Akshaya Tritiya and Raksha Bandhan, similar to those in the Hindu communities.

== Scriptures and texts ==
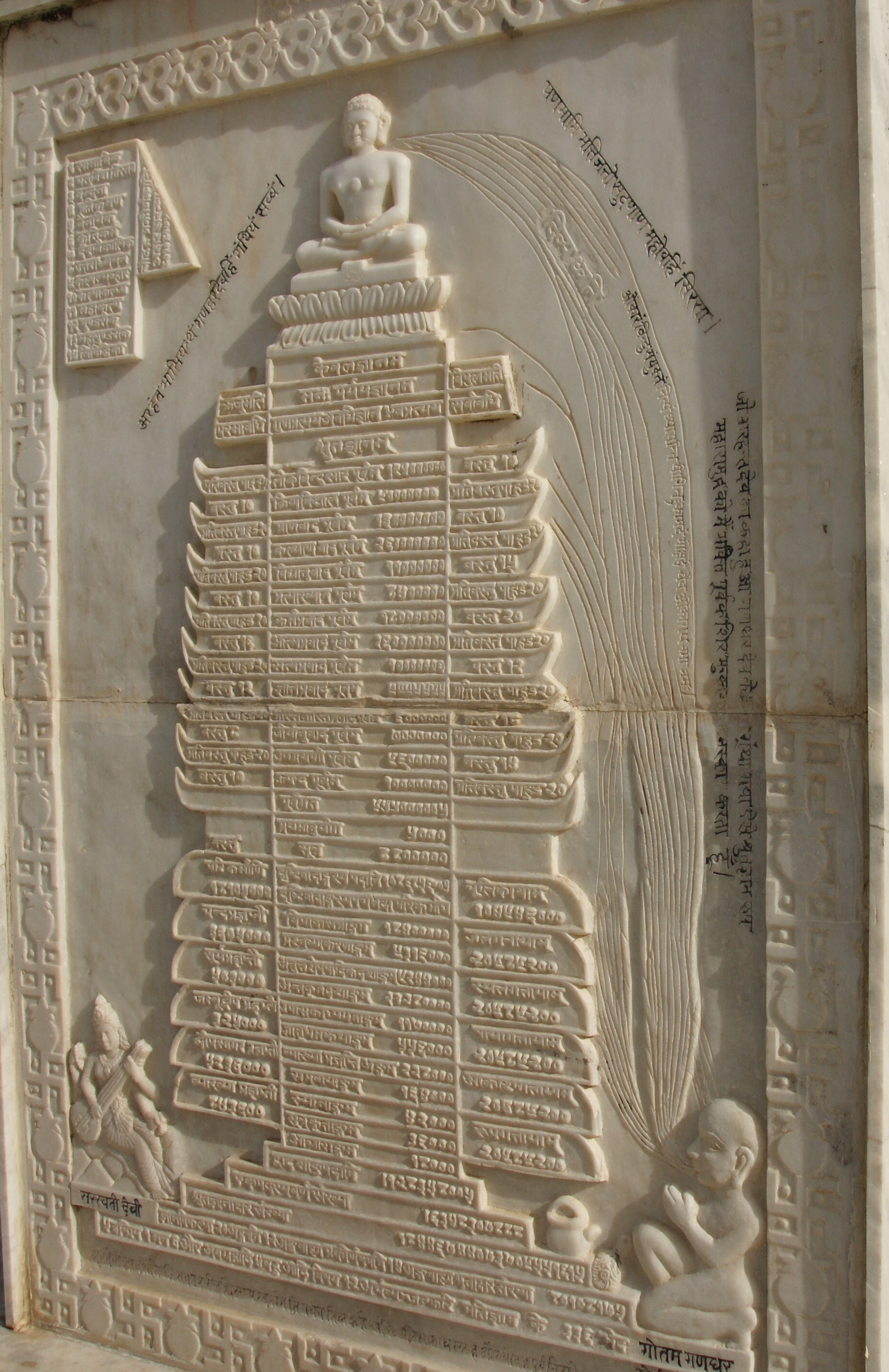
Stela depicting Śhrut Jnāna, or complete scriptural knowledge

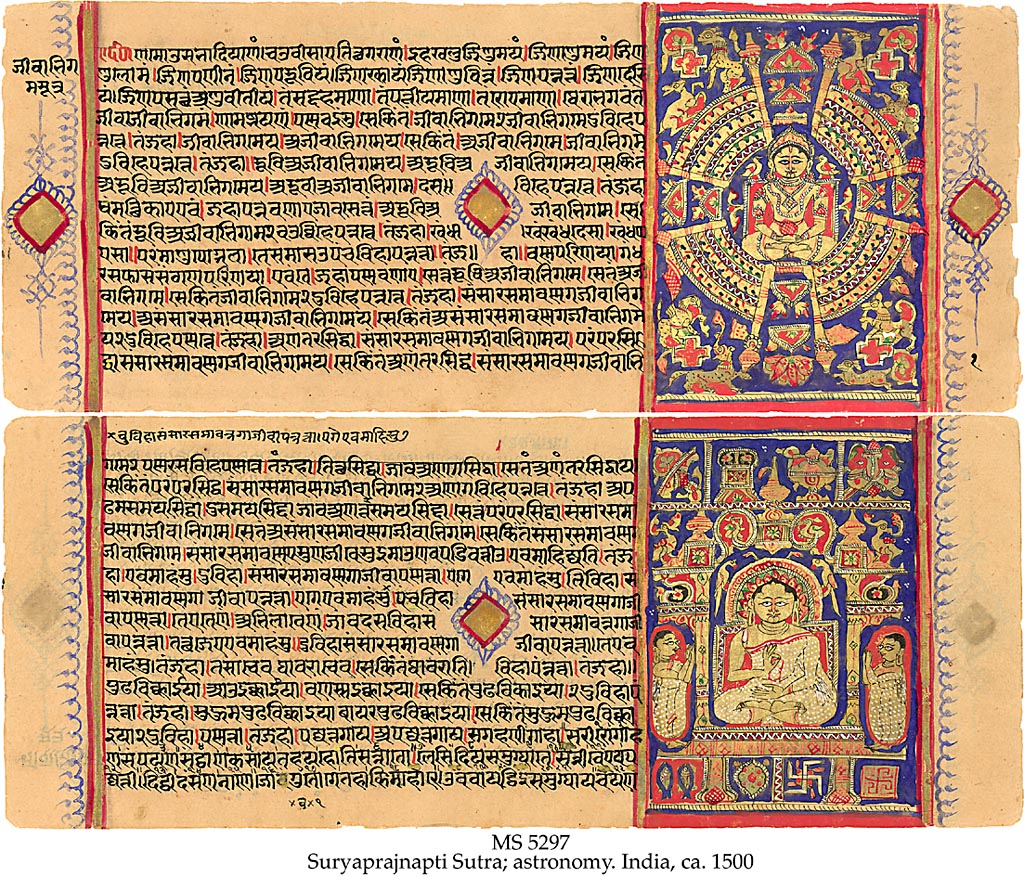
The Suryaprajnaptisūtra, a fourth or third century BCE astronomy text of Śvētāmbara Jains. Above: its manuscript from c. 1500 CE.

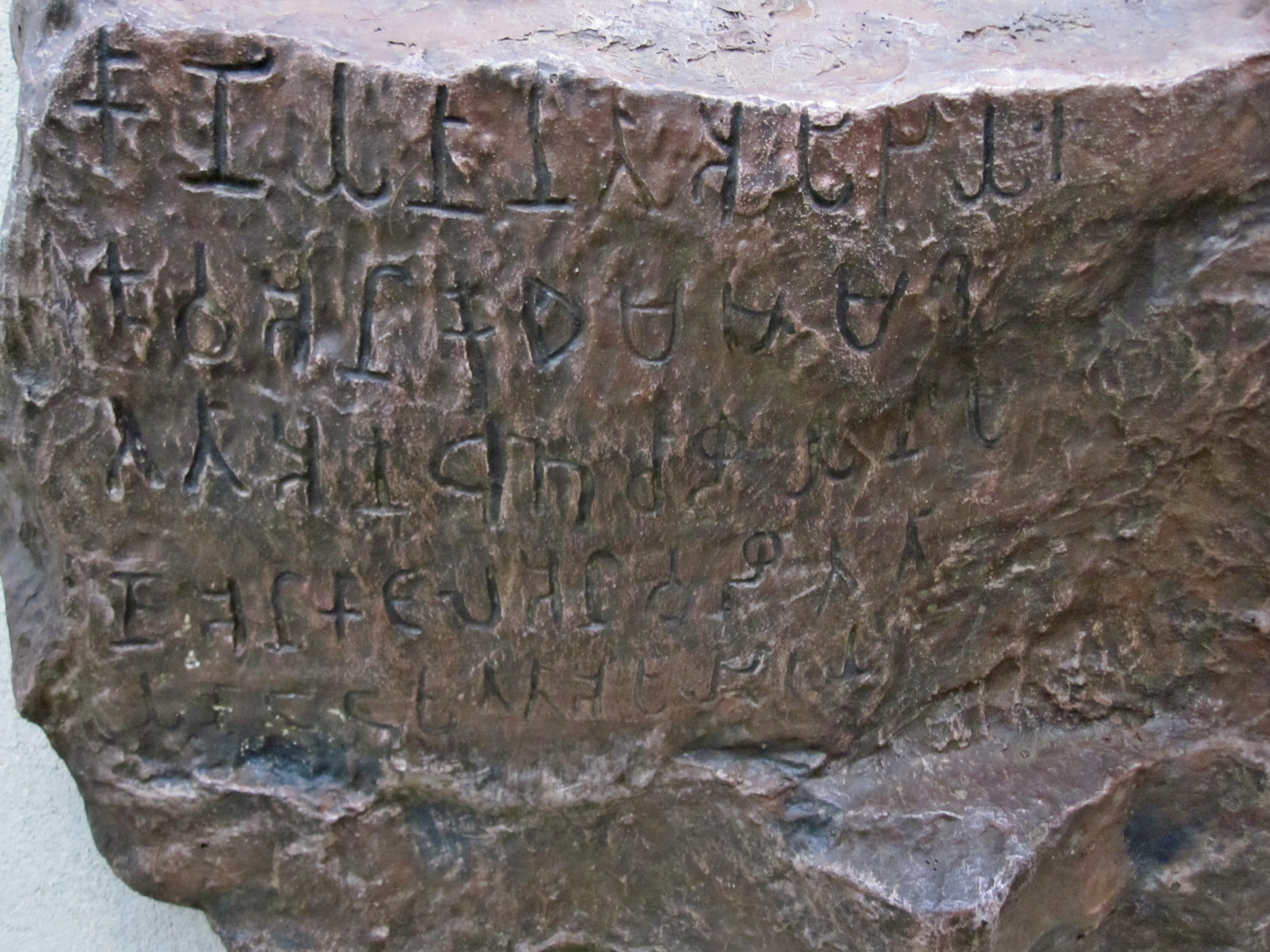
Mangulam inscription dated 3rd century BCE

=== Original canon and transmission ===
Jain canonical scriptures are historically referred to as Agamas. These foundational texts are believed to have been verbally transmitted, mirroring the oral traditions of ancient Buddhist and Hindu texts. The tradition holds that this knowledge originated directly from the sermons of the tirthankaras. These teachings were then cognitively structured and transmitted by their chief disciples (Ganadharas) as heard scriptural knowledge (Shrut Jnana). Theological differences exist regarding the nature of these original sermons: the Śvētāmbara tradition believes the scriptural language was explicitly Ardhamagadhi, whereas the Digambara tradition posits it was a divine, wordless sonic resonance (divya dhvani) subsequently translated into human language by the Ganadharas.

=== Śvētāmbara canonical texts ===
The formal codification of the canon is a primary point of sectarian divergence. The Śvētāmbara tradition maintains that their monastic lineage successfully preserved 45 of the 50 original Jain scriptures, acknowledging the historical loss of one Anga text and four Purva texts. Their canon was formally finalized at the Council of Valabhi in the 5th century CE. Among their non-canonical literature, the Kalpa Sūtras are particularly revered. The Śvētāmbaras attribute this text to Bhadrabahu (c. 300 BCE), maintaining that he migrated to Nepal during a period of famine, while the Digambaras believe he led a migration into South Karnataka and forms the root of their distinct tradition. Both traditions consider his Niryuktis and Samhitas important.

=== Digambara foundational texts ===
The Digambara tradition rejected the Council of Valabhi, maintaining that the original Angas and Purvas were entirely and irrevocably lost over centuries of famine and migration. According to Digambara historical accounts, the last ascetic to possess partial memorized knowledge of the original canon was Dharasena (c. 1st–2nd century CE). To prevent the total extinction of this knowledge, he transmitted the remaining teachings to his disciples, Pushpadanta and Bhutabali, who codified them into the Satkhandagama (Scripture in Six Parts). This text, alongside the Kasayapahuda, forms the absolute foundation of the surviving Digambara canon. Between 600 and 900 CE, Digambara scholars structurally organized their sacred literature into a secondary canon comprising four anuyogas (often referred to as Vedas): (Note: Not to be confused with the four Vedas of Hinduism.) history, cosmography, philosophy, and ethics.

=== Post-canonical scholastic literature ===
During the scholastic era in the Deccan and Southern India, Jain monks produced immense philosophical and scientific literature in both Prakrit and Sanskrit. The earliest surviving Sanskrit text, the Tattvartha Sutra by Umaswati, systematically outlines Jain epistemology and metaphysics and remains uniquely authoritative across all Jain sub-traditions.

The Digambara intellectual tradition is heavily anchored by the texts of Kundakunda (c. 2nd century CE), whose works, including the Samayasāra and Niyamasara, are highly revered for their deep mystical and philosophical frameworks. Subsequent Digambara scholasticism was defined by master logicians such as Samantabhadra, who authored the foundational Ratnakaranda śrāvakācāra, and Pujyapada, who wrote the Sarvārthasiddhi, the oldest surviving Digambara commentary on the Tattvartha Sutra.

This era also yielded profound contributions to global mathematics and cosmology. The Lokavibhaga (Division of the Universe), composed in Prakrit by the Digambara monk Sarvanandi in 458 CE, is globally recognized by historians of mathematics as the earliest surviving written text to utilize a fully operational base-10 decimal place-value system and the number zero. Mathematical cosmology was further codified in the 6th century by Yativṛṣabha in the Tiloya Panatti. In the 9th century, this scholastic era culminated in the Dhavala, a massive 72,000-verse commentary on the Satkhandagama authored by Virasena, permanently securing the Digambara theological framework.

=== Modern mystical traditions ===
In the late 19th and 20th centuries, the classical Digambara texts attributed to Kundakunda directly inspired a resurgence of lay-led mystical movements within Jainism. The mystic and philosopher Shrimad Rajchandra (1867–1901) drew heavily from these texts, and his teachings subsequently influenced a variety of modern religious figures and movements, including Kanji Swami (founder of the Kanji Panth), Dada Bhagwan, Rakesh Jhaveri (Shrimad Rajchandra Mission), Saubhagyabhai, Lalluji Maharaj, and Atmanandji. Sociological observers note that in recent years, there has been a convergence among these movements, particularly within the educated and globally mobile Jain diaspora, reflecting a trend toward a more ecumenical, text-focused, and less strictly sectarian practice of Jainism.

== Art, architecture, and archaeology ==
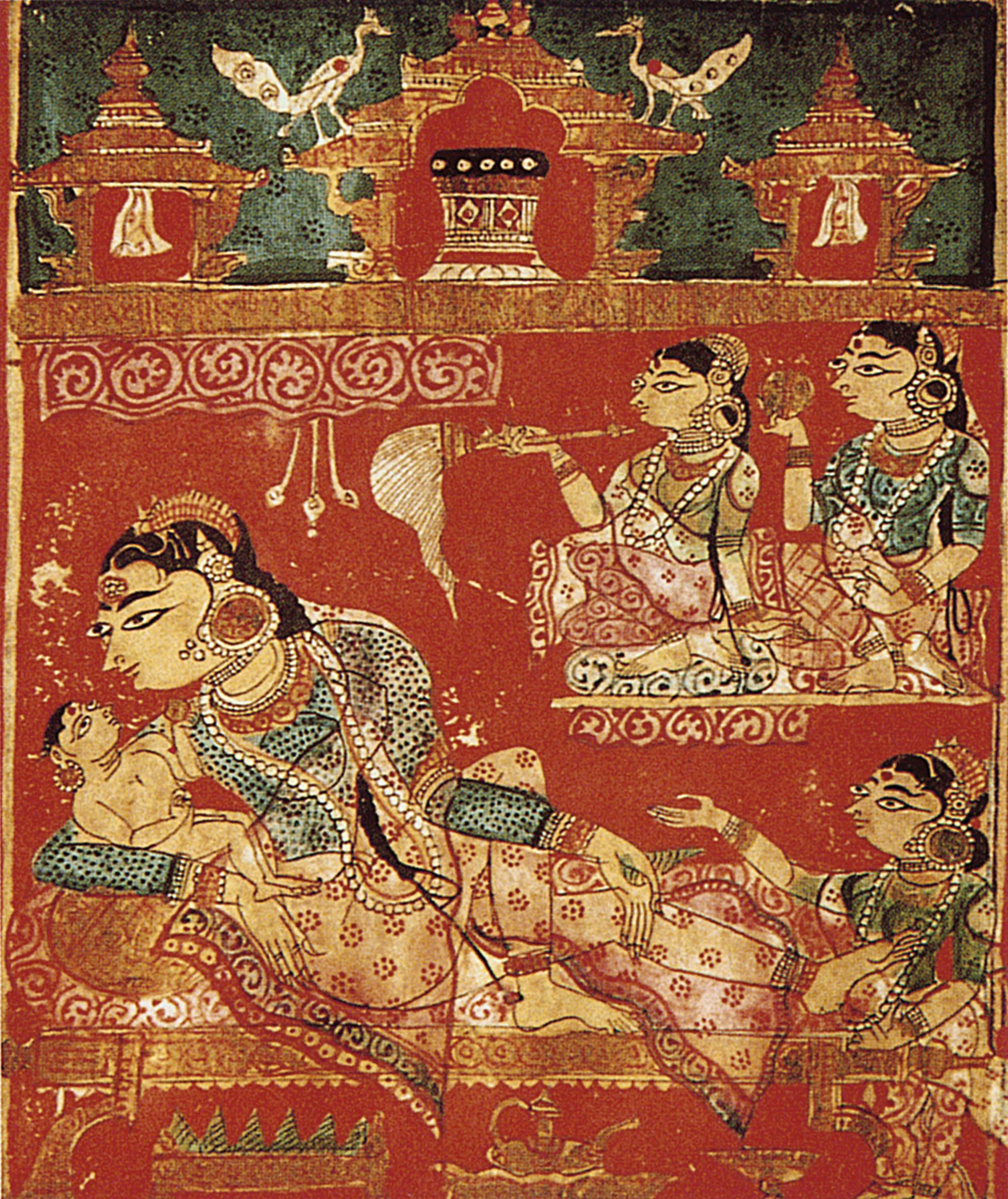
The birth of Mahavira, from the Kalpa Sūtra (c. 1375–1400 CE)

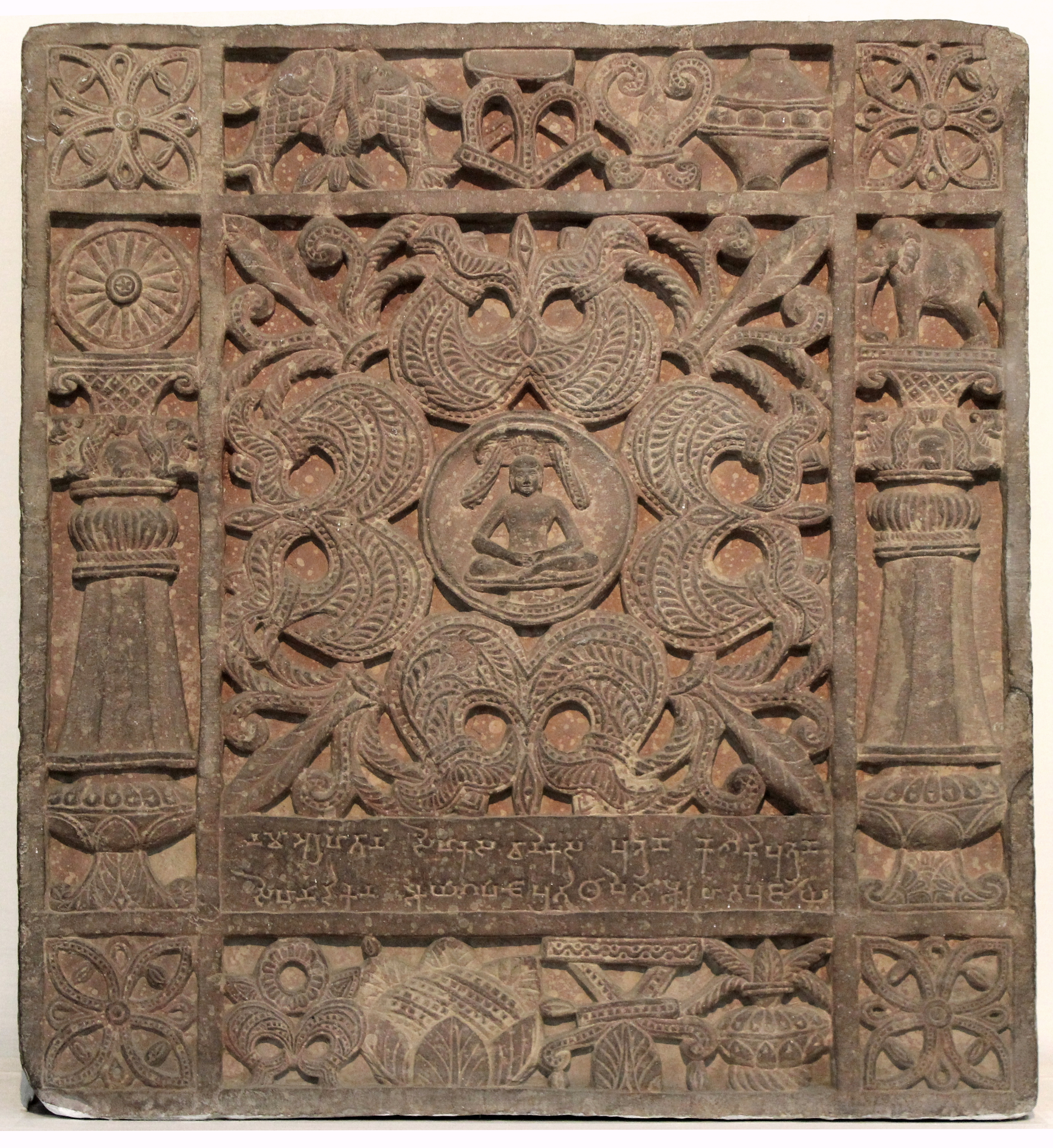
Sihanamdika ayagapata, 25–50 CE, Kankali Tila, Mathura, Uttar Pradesh

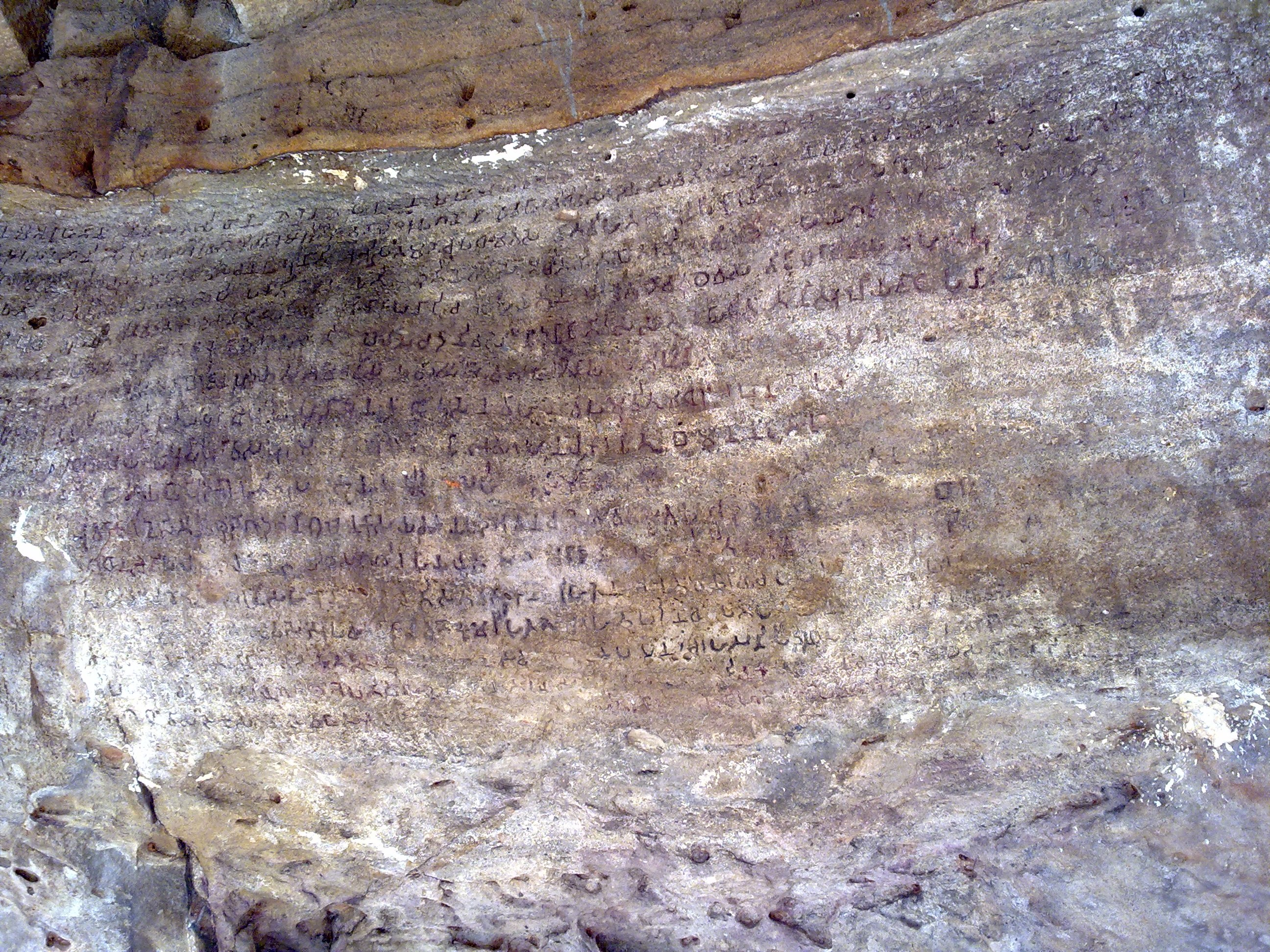
Inscriptions at a Udaygiri-Khandagiri 2nd–1st-century BCE Jain rock cut cave, Odisha

Jainism has contributed significantly to Indian art and architecture. Jain arts depict life legends of tirthankara or other important people, particularly with them in a seated or standing meditative posture. Yakshas and yakshinis, attendant spirits who guard the tirthankara, are usually shown with them. The earliest known Jain image is in the Patna museum. It is dated approximately to the third century BCE. Bronze images of Pārśva can be seen in the Prince of Wales Museum, Mumbai, and in the Patna museum; these are dated to the second century BCE.

Ayagapata is a type of votive tablet used in Jainism for donation and worship in the early centuries. These tablets are decorated with objects and designs central to Jain worship such as the stupa, dharmacakra and triratna. They present simultaneous trends or image and symbol worship. Numerous such stone tablets were discovered during excavations at ancient Jain sites like Kankali Tila near Mathura in Uttar Pradesh, India. The practice of donating these tablets is documented from first century BCE to the third century CE. Samavasarana, a preaching hall of tirthankaras with various beings concentrically placed, is an important theme of Jain art.

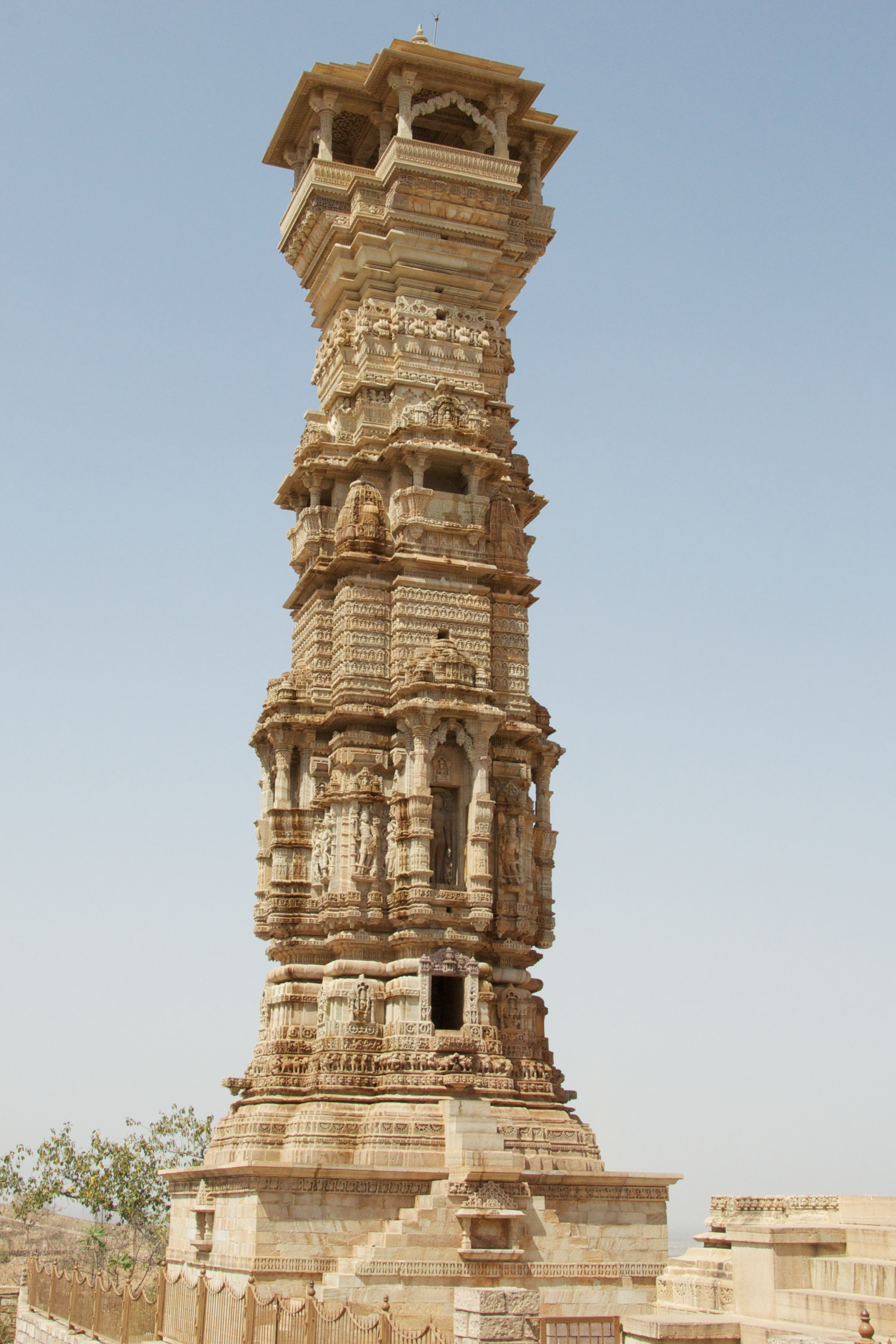
Kirti Stambh in Chittor Fort, 12th century CE

The Jain tower in Chittor, Rajasthan, is a good example of Jain architecture. Decorated manuscripts are preserved in Jain libraries, containing diagrams from Jain cosmology. Most of the paintings and illustrations depict historical events, known as Panch Kalyanaka, from the life of the tirthankara. Rishabha, the first tirthankara, is usually depicted in either the lotus position or kayotsarga, the standing position. He is distinguished from other tirthankara by the long locks of hair falling to his shoulders. Bull images also appear in his sculptures. In paintings, incidents from his life, like his marriage and Indra marking his forehead, are depicted. Other paintings show him presenting a pottery bowl to his followers; he is also seen painting a house, weaving, and being visited by his mother Marudevi. Each of the twenty-four tirthankara is associated with distinctive emblems, which are listed in such texts as Tiloyapannati, Kahavaali and Pravacanasaarodhara.

=== Temples ===
Major pilgrimage and temple sites in Jainism

A Jain temple, a Derasar or Basadi, is a place of worship. Temples contain tirthankara images, some fixed, others moveable. These are stationed in the inner sanctum, one of the two sacred zones, the other being the main hall. One of the images is marked as the moolnayak (primary deity). A manastambha (column of honor) is a pillar that is often constructed in front of Jain temples. Temple construction is considered a meritorious act.

Ancient Jain monuments include the Udaigiri Hills near Bhelsa (Vidisha) and Pataini temple in Madhya Pradesh, the Ellora in Maharashtra, the Palitana temples in Gujarat, and the Jain temples at Dilwara Temples near Mount Abu, Rajasthan. Chaumukha temple in Ranakpur is considered one of the most beautiful Jain temples and is famous for its detailed carvings. According to Jain texts, Shikharji is the place where twenty of the twenty-four Jain Tīrthaṅkaras along with many other monks attained moksha (died without being reborn, with their soul in Siddhashila). The Shikharji site in northeastern Jharkhand is therefore a revered pilgrimage site. (Note: Some texts refer to the place as Mount Sammeta.) The Palitana temples are the holiest shrine for the Śvētāmbara Murtipujaka sect. Along with Shikharji the two sites are considered the holiest of all pilgrimage sites by the Jain community. The Jain complex, Khajuraho and Jain Narayana temple are part of a UNESCO World Heritage Site. Shravanabelagola, Saavira Kambada Basadi or 1000 pillars and Brahma Jinalaya are important Jain centers in Karnataka. In and around Madurai, there are 26 caves, 200 stone beds, 60 inscriptions, and over 100 sculptures.

The second–first century BCE Udayagiri and Khandagiri Caves are rich with carvings of tirthanakars and deities with inscriptions including the Elephant Cave inscription. Jain cave temples at Badami, Mangi-Tungi and the Ellora Caves are considered important. The Sittanavasal Cave temple is a fine example of Jain art with an early cave shelter, and a medieval rock-cut temple with excellent fresco paintings comparable to Ajantha. Inside are seventeen stone beds with second century BCE. Tamil-Brahmi inscriptions. The eighth century Kazhugumalai temple marks the revival of Jainism in South India.

Jain temples in India and abroad

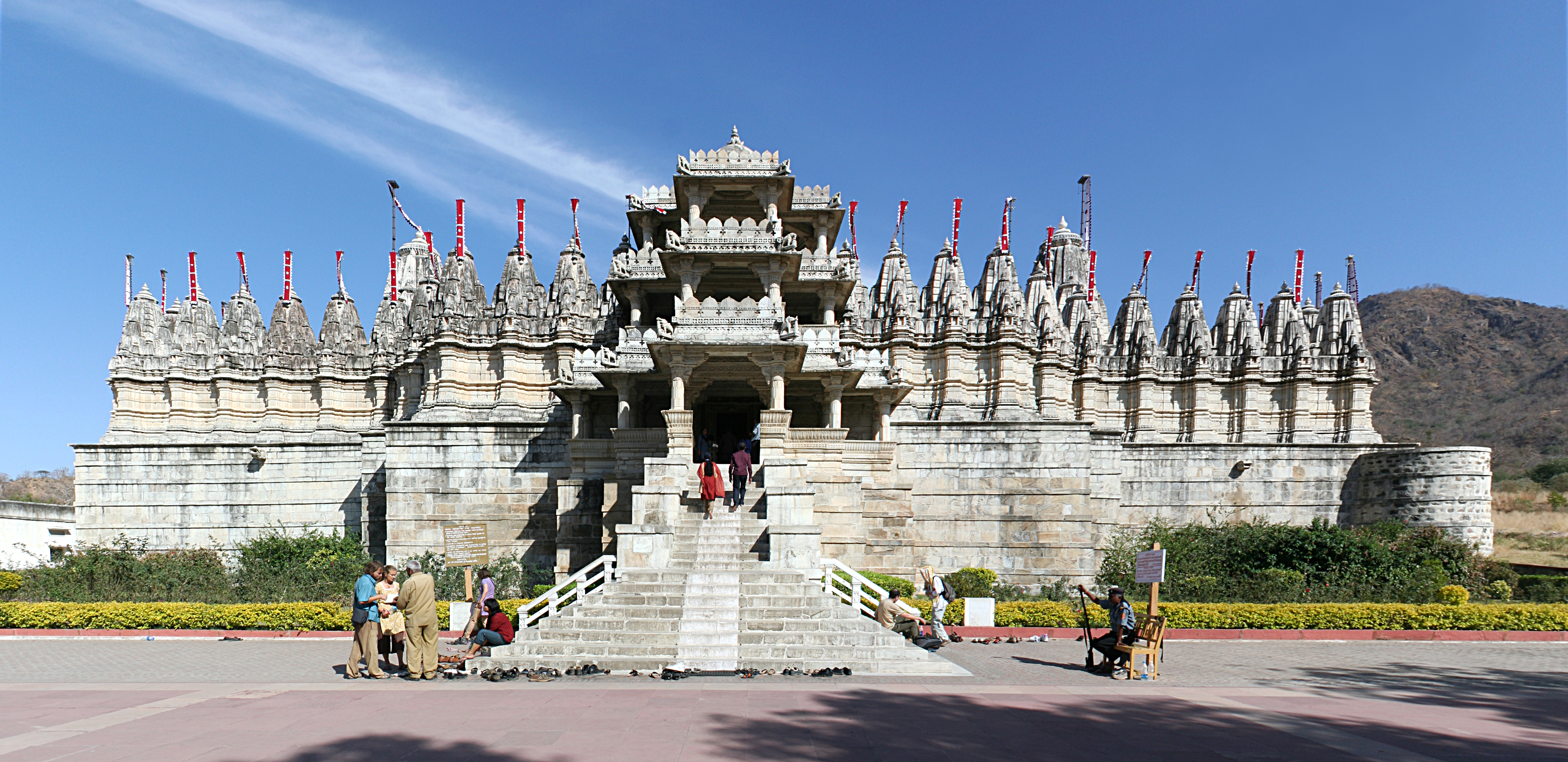
Ranakpur Jain Temple

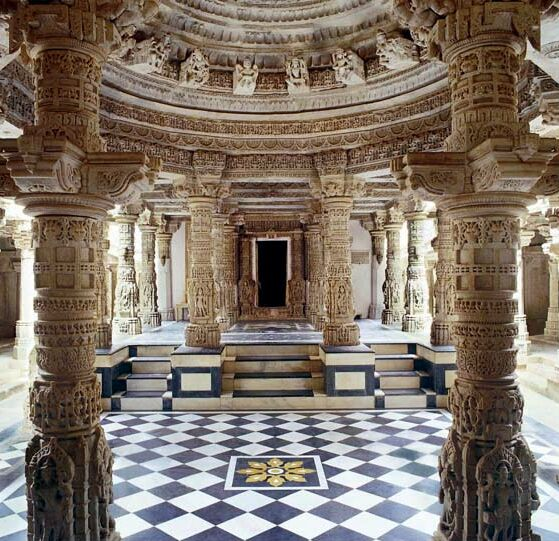
Dilwara Temples

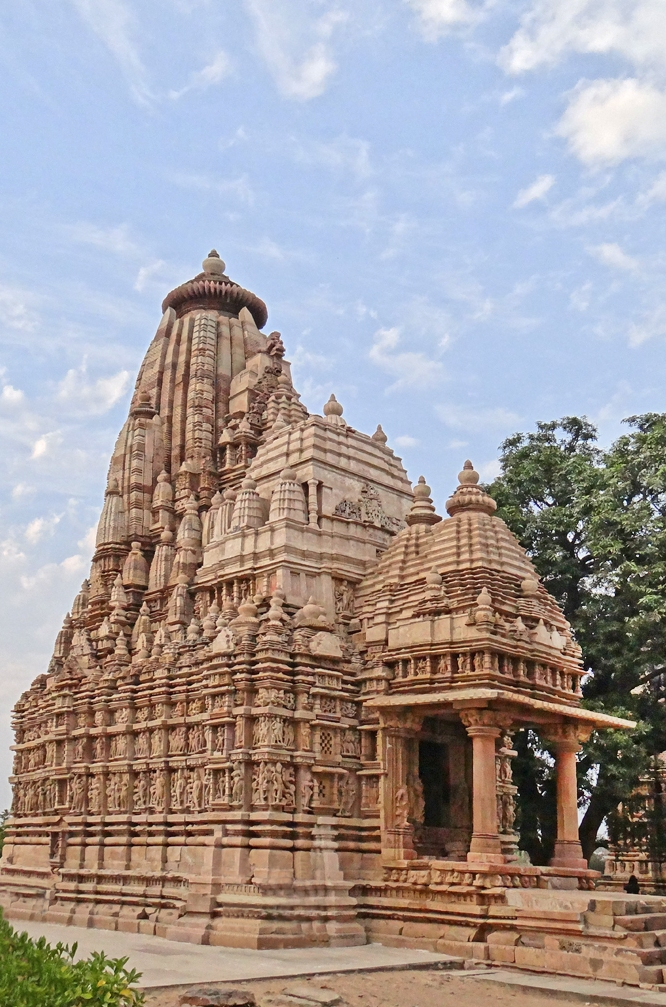
Parshvanath Temple in Khajuraho

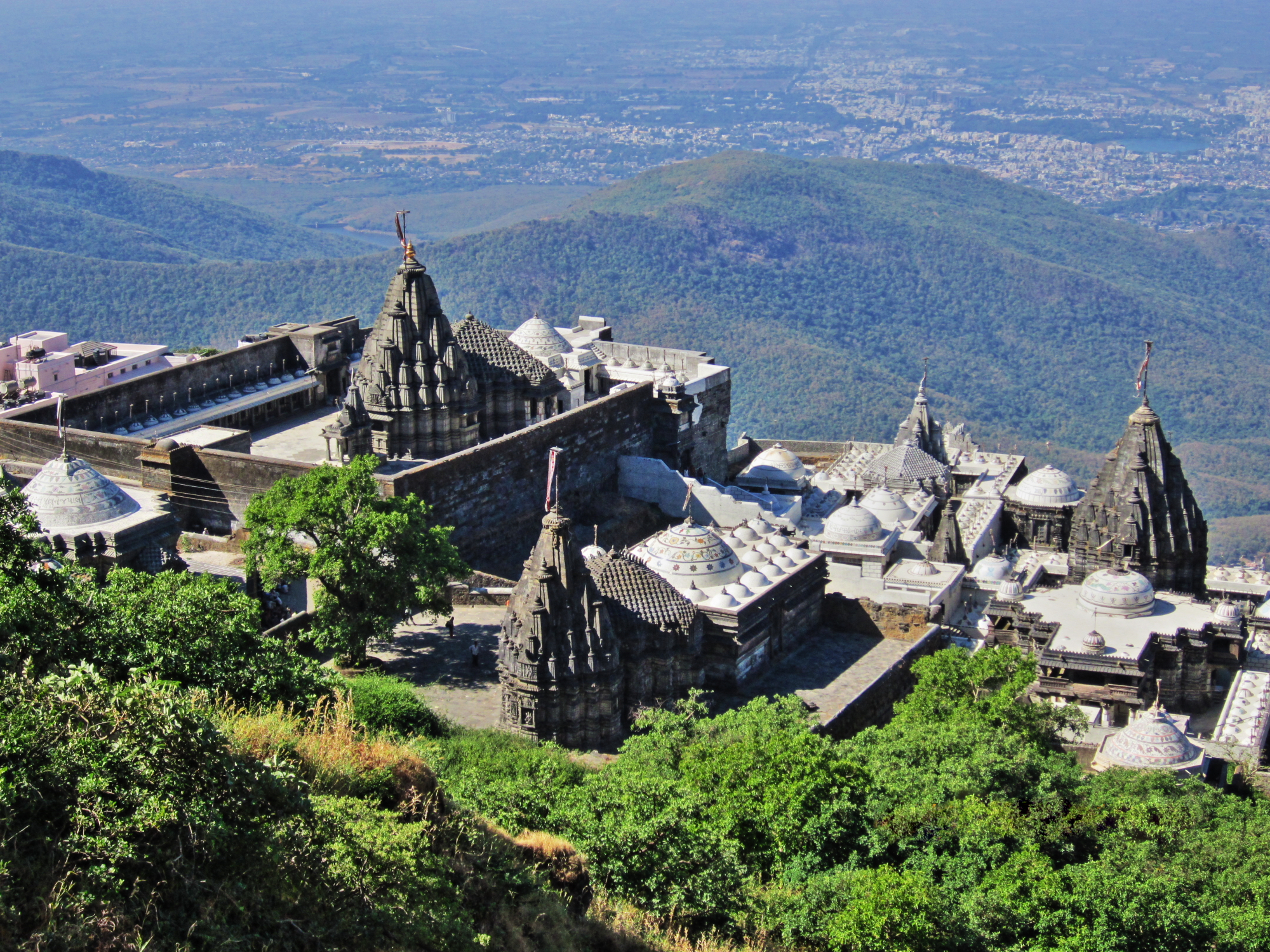
Girnar Jain temples

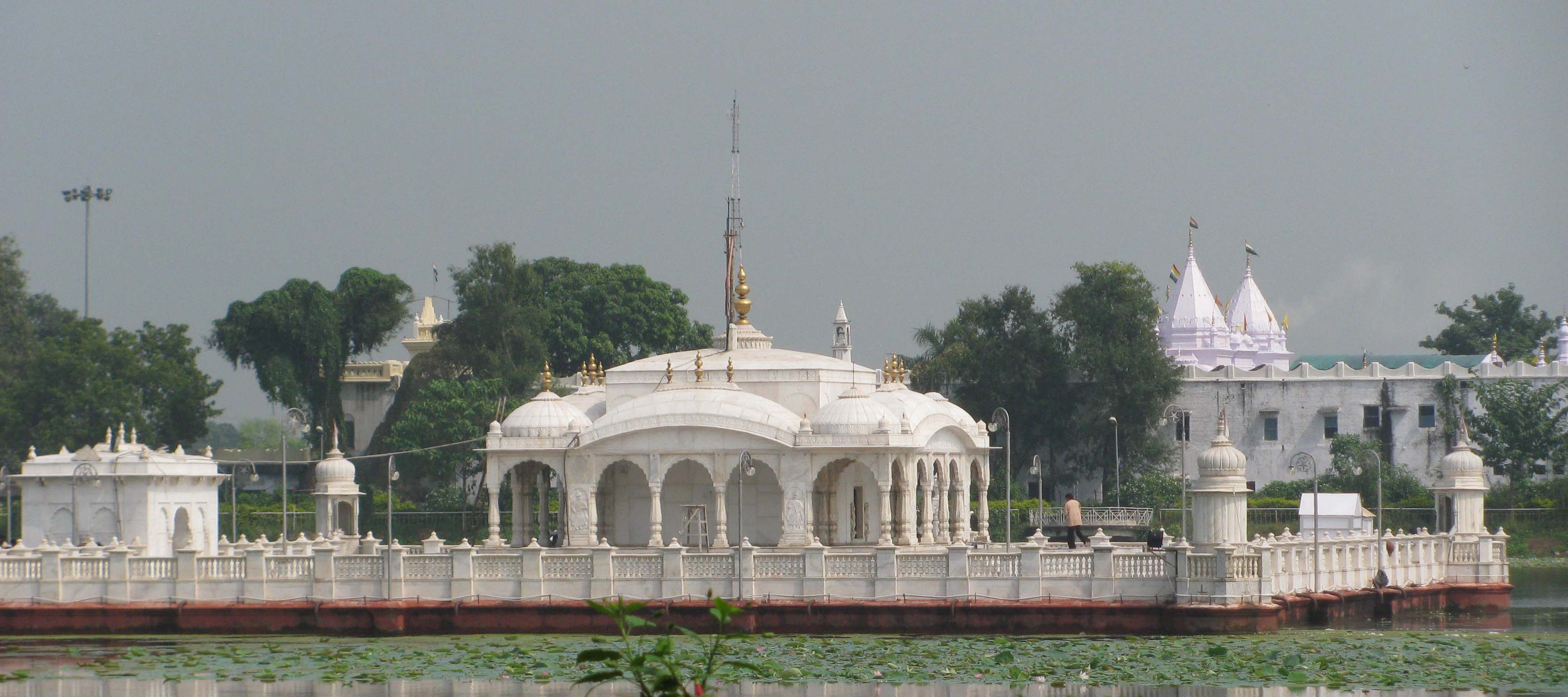
Jal Mandir, Pawapuri

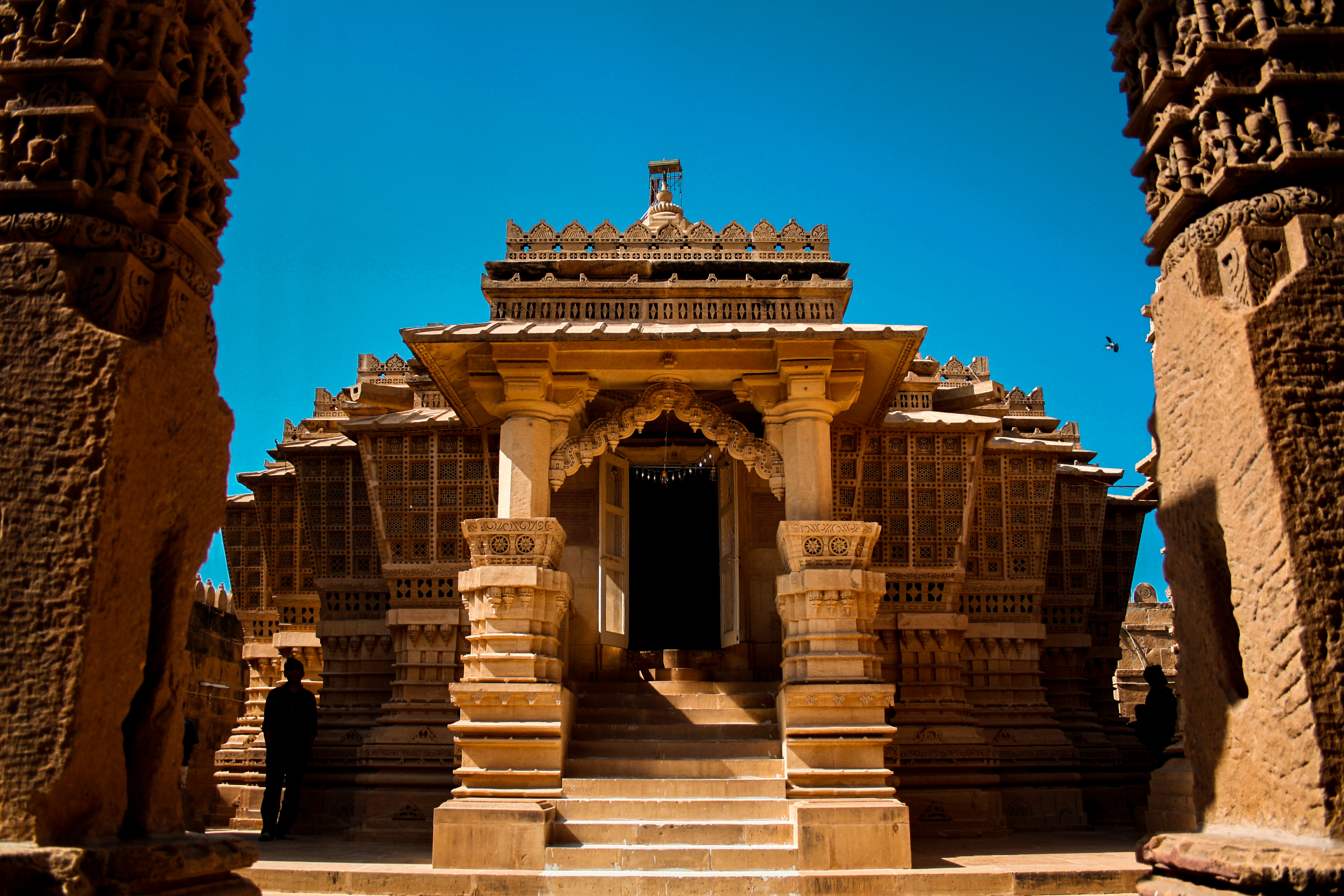
Lodhurva Jain temple

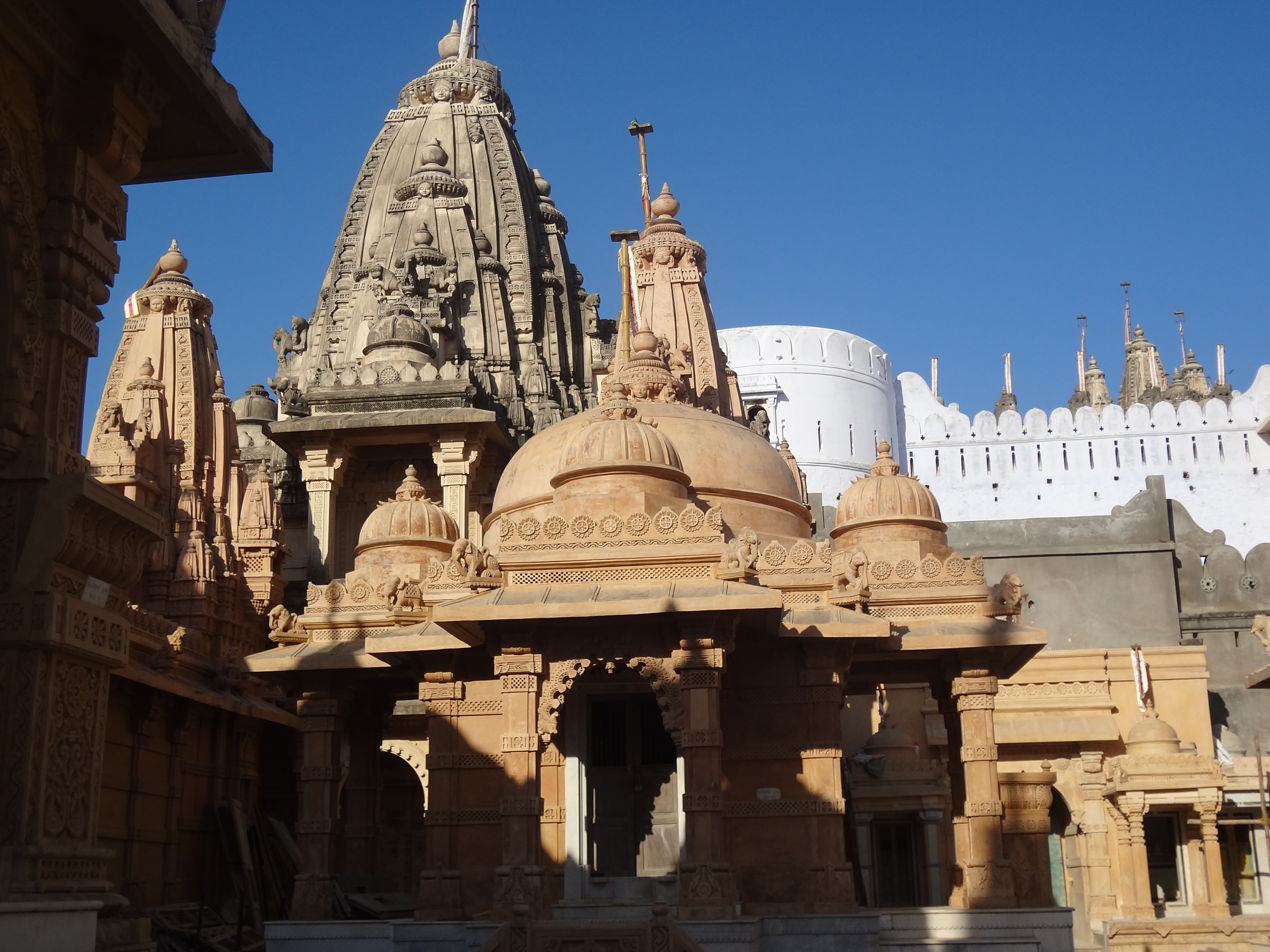
Palitana temples

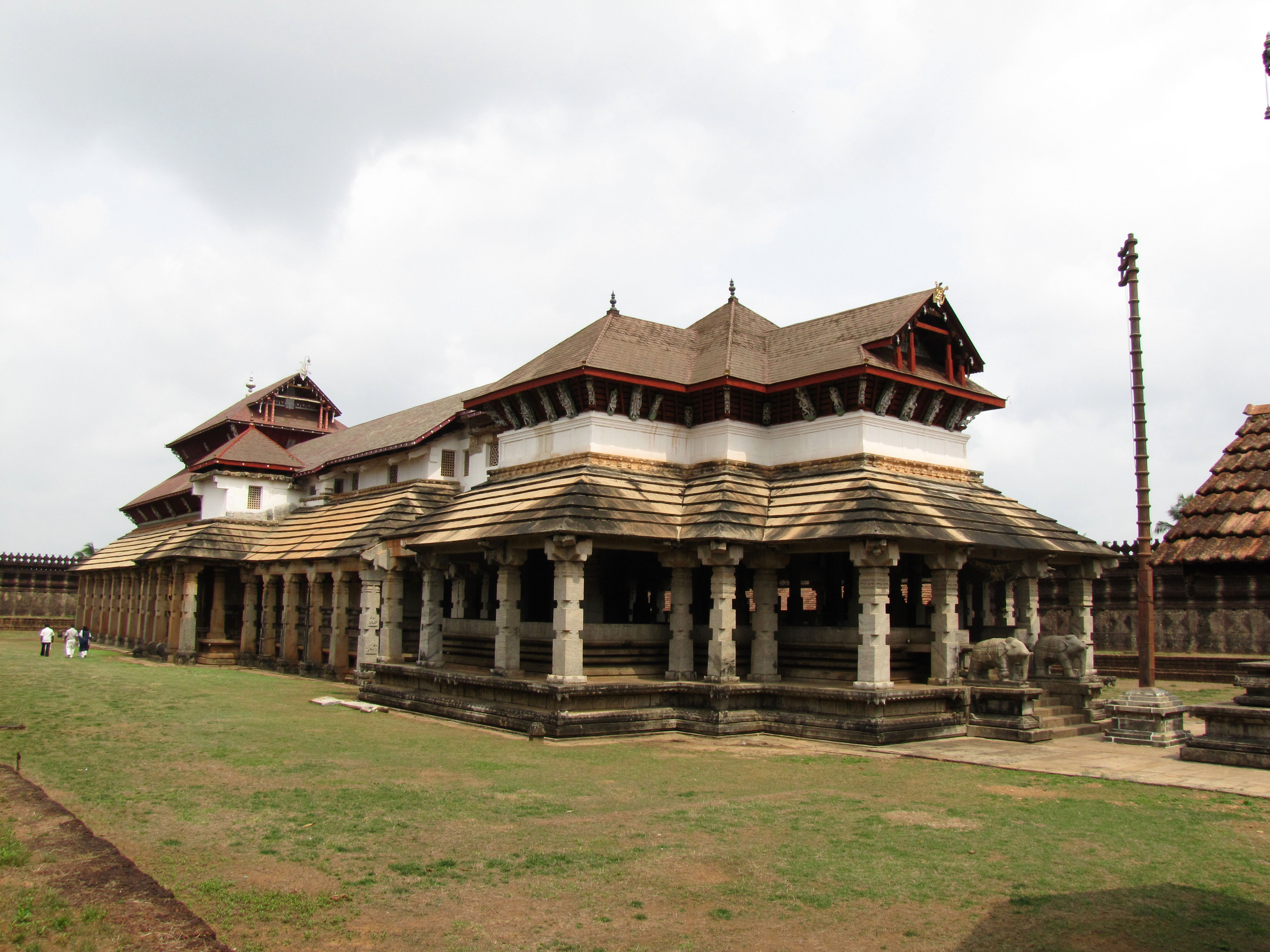
Saavira Kambada Basadi, Moodbidri, Karnataka

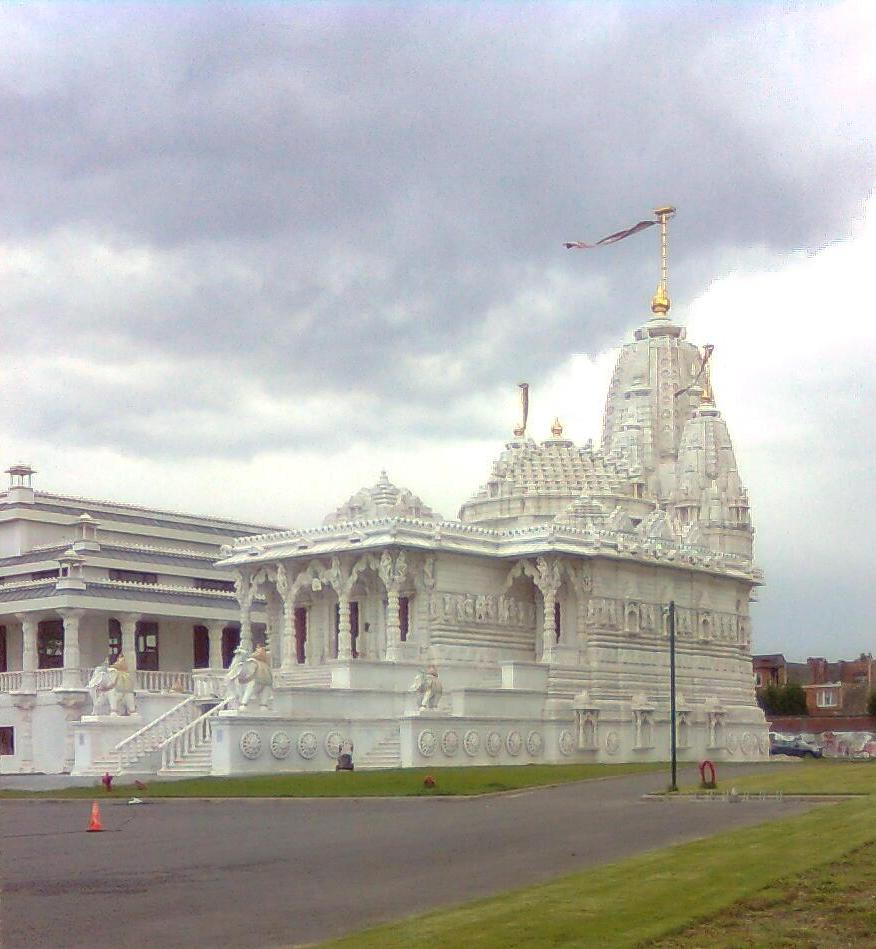
Jain temple, Antwerp, Belgium

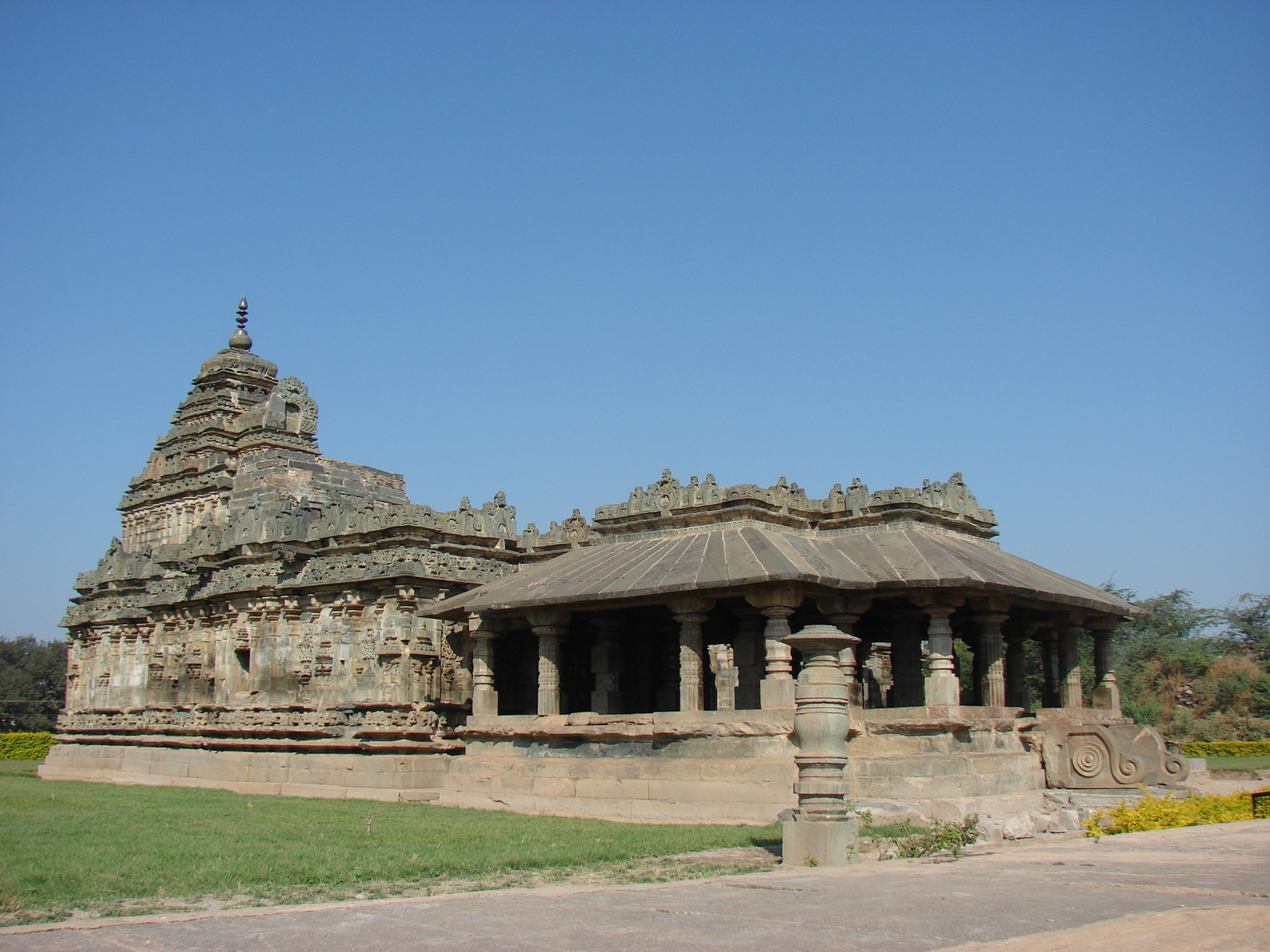
Brahma Jinalaya, Lakkundi

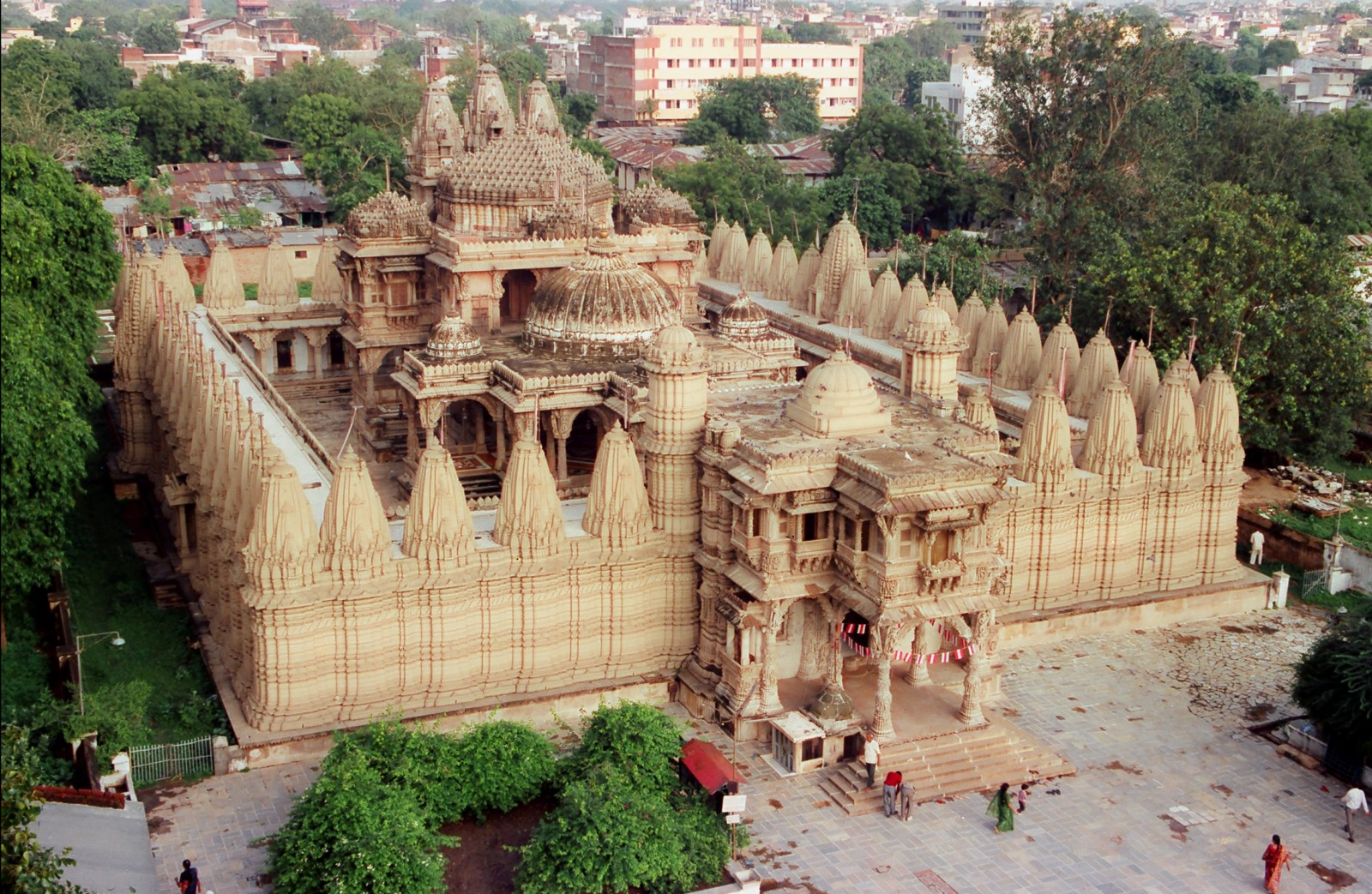
Hutheesing Jain Temple

=== Pilgrimages ===
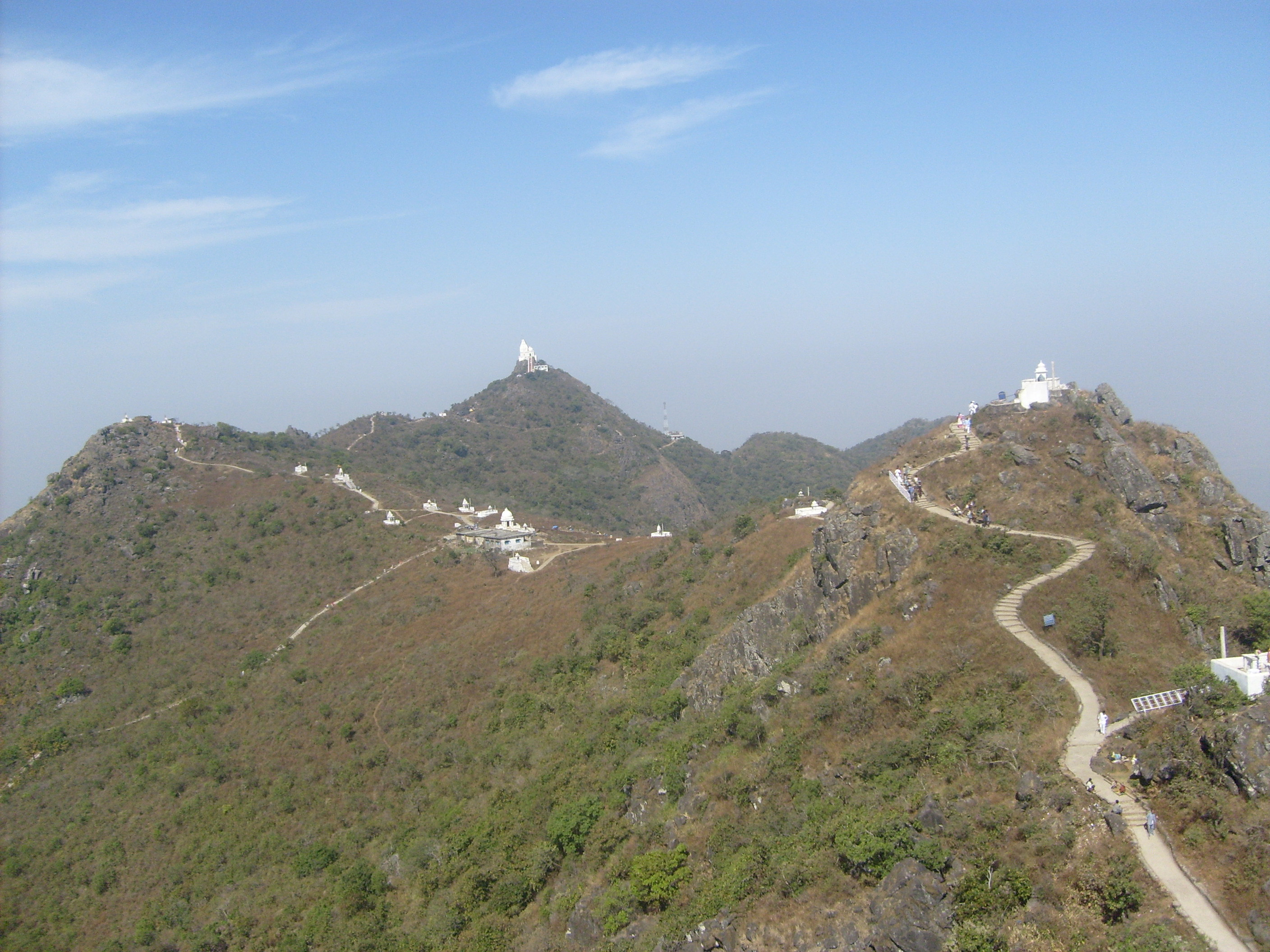
Shikharji

Jain Tirtha (pilgrim) sites are divided into the following categories:

- Siddhakshetra – Site of the moksha of an arihant (kevalin) or tirthankara, such as: Ashtapada of Rishabhanatha, Shikharji of 20 Tirthankara, Girnar of Neminatha, Pawapuri of Mahaveera, Champapuri (capital of Anga) of Vasupujya, Mangi-Tungi of Ram, Palitana of 3 Pandavas.
- Atishayakshetra – Locations where divine events are believed to have occurred, such as: Mahavirji, Rishabhdeo, Kundalpur, Tijara, and Aharji.
- Puranakshetra – Places associated with the lives of great men, such as: Ayodhya, Vidisha, Hastinapur, and Rajgir.
- Gyanakshetra – Places associated with famous acharyas, or centers of learning, such as Shravanabelagola.

Outside contemporary India, Jain communities built temples in locations such as Nagarparkar, Sindh (Pakistan). According to a UNESCO tentative world heritage site application, Nagarparkar was not a "major religious centre or a place of pilgrimage" for Jainism, but it was once an important cultural landscape before "the last remaining Jain community left the area in 1947 at Partition".

=== Statues and sculptures ===
Gommateshwara (Bahubali)
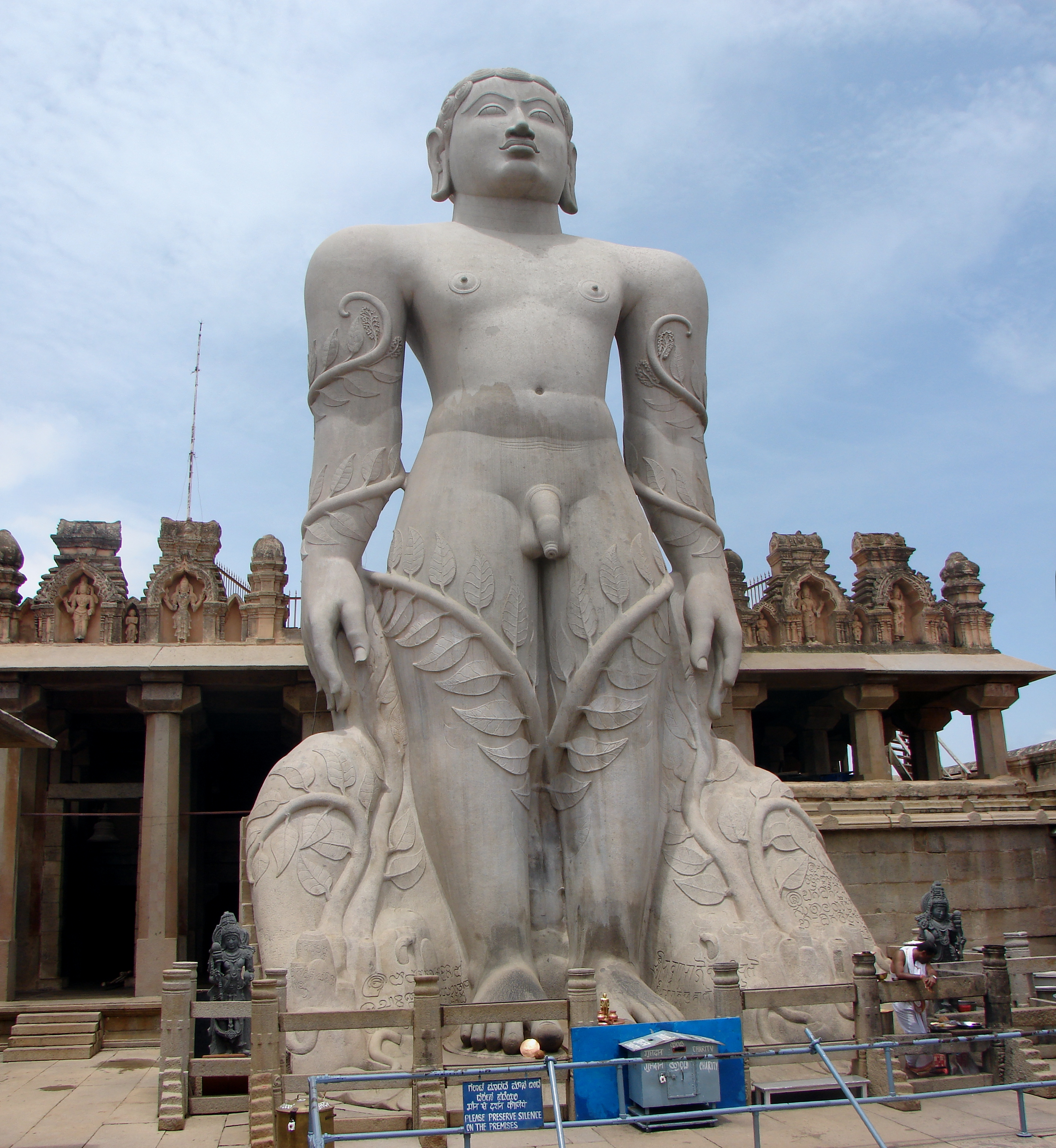
- The 18-metre (59-foot) tall monolithic statue of Bahubali built in 981 CE

Religion
- Affiliation: Jainism

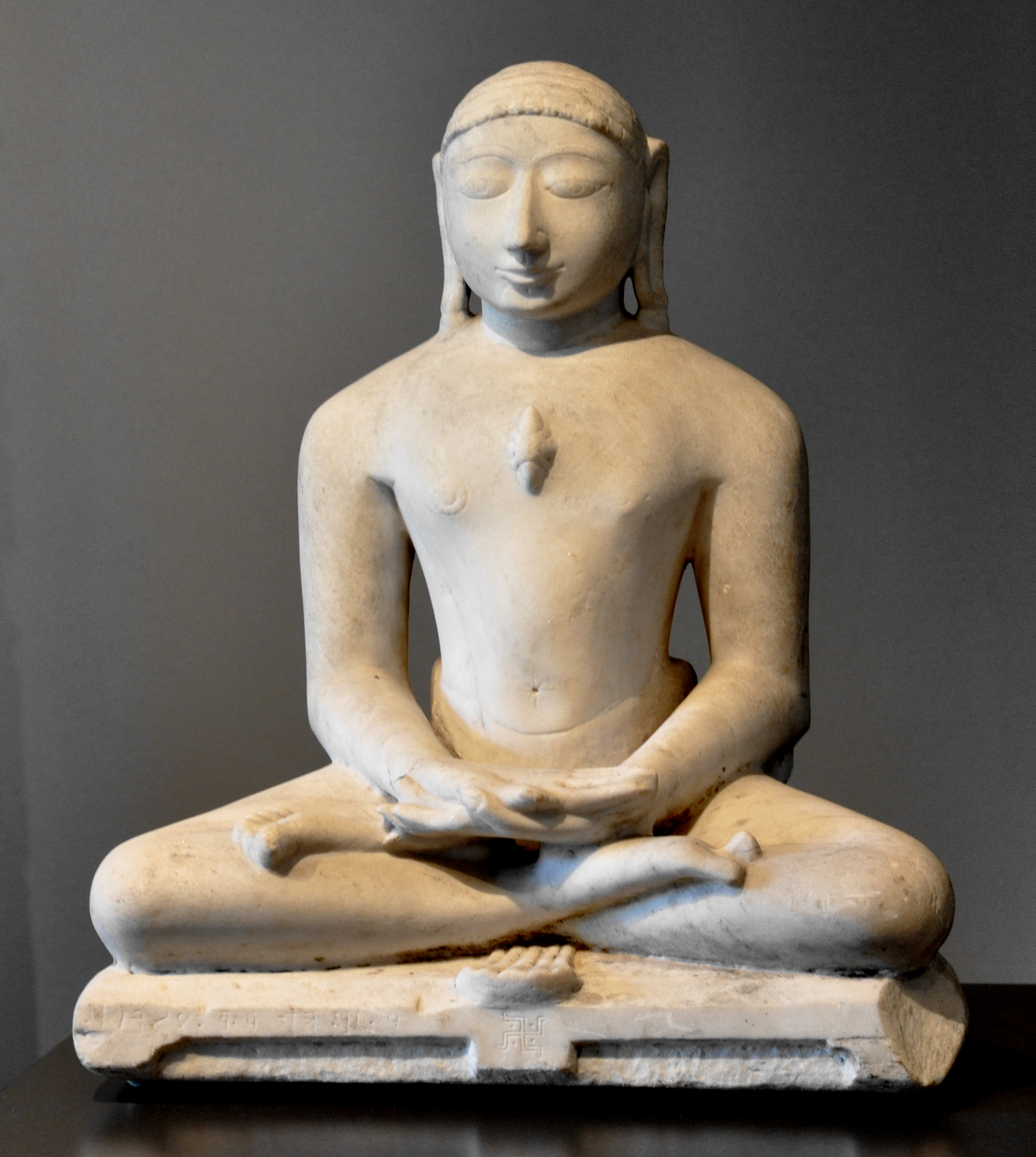
Idol of Suparśvanātha

Jain sculptures usually depict one of the twenty-four tīrthaṅkaras; Parshvanatha, Rishabhanatha and Mahāvīra are among the more popular, often seated in lotus position or kayotsarga, along with Arihant, Bahubali, and protector deities like Ambika. Quadruple images are also popular. Tirthankar idols look similar, differentiated by their individual symbol, except for Parshvanatha whose head is crowned by a snake. Digambara images are naked without any beautification, whereas Śvētāmbara depictions are clothed and ornamented.

A monolithic, 18-metre (59-foot) tall statue of Bahubali, Gommateshvara, built in 981 CE by the Ganga minister and commander Chavundaraya, is situated on a hilltop in Shravanabelagola in Karnataka. This statue was voted first in the SMS poll Seven Wonders of India conducted by The Times of India. The 33-metre (108-foot) tall Statue of Ahiṃsā (depicting Rishabhanatha) was erected in the Nashik district in 2015. Idols are often made in Ashtadhatu (literally "eight metals"), namely Akota Bronze, brass, gold, silver, stone monoliths, rock cut, and precious stones.

=== Symbols ===
Om in Jainism

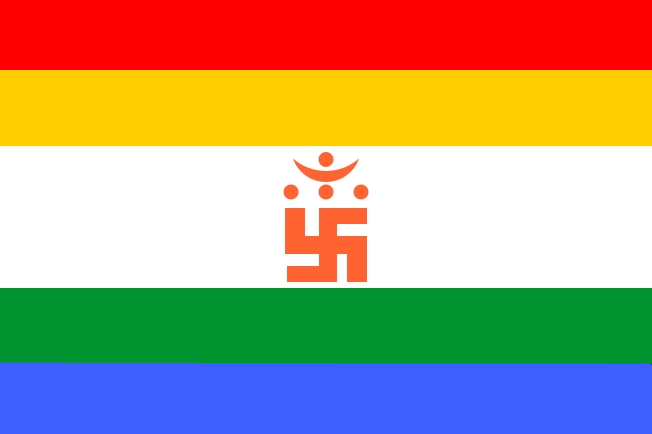
Jain flag

Flag for Indian Jains

Jain icons and arts incorporate symbols such as the swastika, Om, and the Ashtamangala. In Jainism, Om is a condensed reference to the initials "A-A-A-U-M" of the five parameshthis: "Arihant, Ashiri, Acharya, Upajjhaya, Muni". The Ashtamangala is a set of eight auspicious symbols: in the Digambara tradition, these are chatra, dhvaja, kalasha, fly-whisk, mirror, chair, hand fan and vessel. In the Śvētāmbar tradition, they are Swastika, Srivatsa, Nandavarta, Vardhmanaka (food vessel), Bhadrasana (seat), Kalasha (pot), Darpan (mirror) and pair of fish.

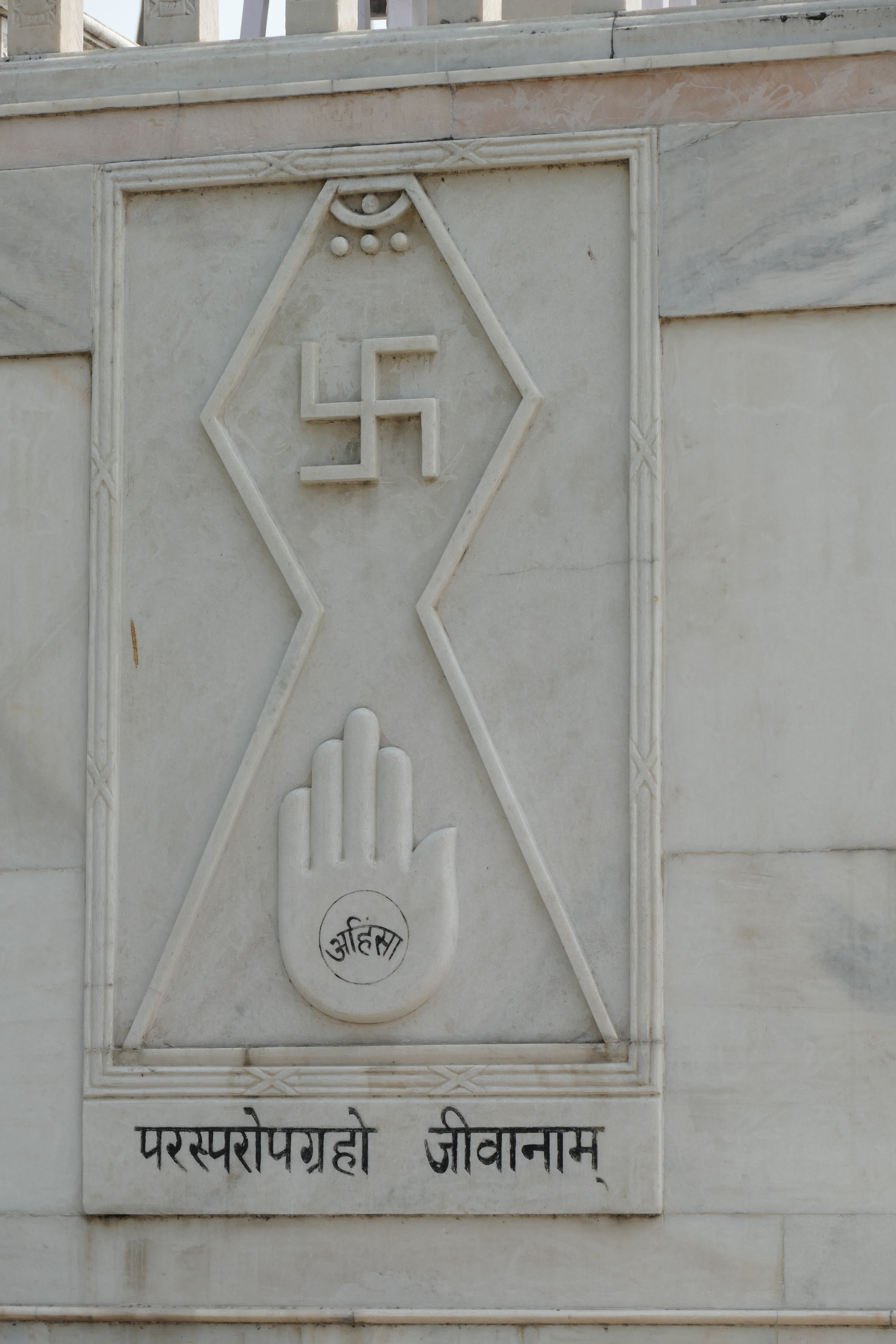
A symbol to represent the Jain community was chosen in 1975 as part of the commemoration of the 2,500th anniversary of Mahavira's nirvana.

The hand with a wheel on the palm symbolizes ahimsā. The wheel represents the dharmachakra, which stands for the resolve to halt the saṃsāra (wandering) through the relentless pursuit of ahimsā. The five colours of the Jain flag represent the Pañca-Parameṣṭhi and the five vows. The swastika's four arms symbolise the four realms in which rebirth occurs according to Jainism: humans, heavenly beings, hellish beings and non-humans. The three dots on the top represent the three jewels mentioned in ancient texts: correct faith, correct understanding and correct conduct, believed to lead to spiritual perfection.

In 1974, on the 2500th anniversary of the nirvana of Mahāvīra, the Jain community chose a single combined image for Jainism. It depicts the three lokas, heaven, the human world and hell. The semi-circular topmost portion symbolizes Siddhashila, a zone beyond the three realms. The Jain swastika and the symbol of Ahiṃsā are included, with the Jain mantra Parasparopagraho Jīvānām from sūtra 5.21 of Umaswati's Tattvarthasūtra, meaning "souls render service to one another".

== Jainism and ecology ==
Jainism, one of the world's oldest religions, offers a profound ecological philosophy rooted in its core principles. As noted in the Jain Declaration on Nature, "Jainism is fundamentally a religion of ecology and has turned ecology into a religion. It has enabled Jains to create an environment-friendly value system and code of conduct." Central to Jain ethics is ahimsa (non-violence), which extends beyond human interactions to encompass all living beings. "All breathing, existing, living, sentient beings should not be slain, nor treated with violence, nor abused, nor tormented, nor driven away. This is the pure, unchangeable, eternal law."

The Jain concept of parasparopagrahojīvānām in the Tattvarth Sutra, the most authoritative sacred text of Jains, teaches that all souls are responsible for one another and underscores the mutual interdependence of all life forms. Mahavira, the founder of Jainism taught, "One who neglects or disregards the existence of earth, air, fire, water and vegetation disregards his own existence which is entwined with them." This principle is not merely philosophical but is reflected in daily practices. For instance, Jain monks and nuns often wear masks to prevent inhaling and harming microscopic organisms, demonstrating meticulous care for even the smallest forms of life.

Jainism also emphasizes aparigraha (non-possessiveness), advocating for minimal consumption and a lifestyle that avoids excess. This principle encourages individuals to live sustainably, reducing their ecological footprint. "Using any resource beyond one's needs and misuse of any part of nature is considered a form of theft. Indeed, the Jain faith goes one radical step further and declares unequivocally that waste and creating pollution are acts of violence."

In contemporary times, Jain communities continue to uphold these ecological principles through various initiatives. These include tree planting, wildlife conservation, and promoting vegetarianism, all aimed at fostering a harmonious relationship with nature. Such practices exemplify the enduring relevance of Jain teachings in addressing modern environmental challenges.

Through its unwavering commitment to non-violence, interdependence, and minimalism, Jainism offers a holistic framework for ecological sustainability, emphasizing the sacredness of all life and the importance of living in harmony with the environment.

== Comparison with other religions ==
Jain stupa
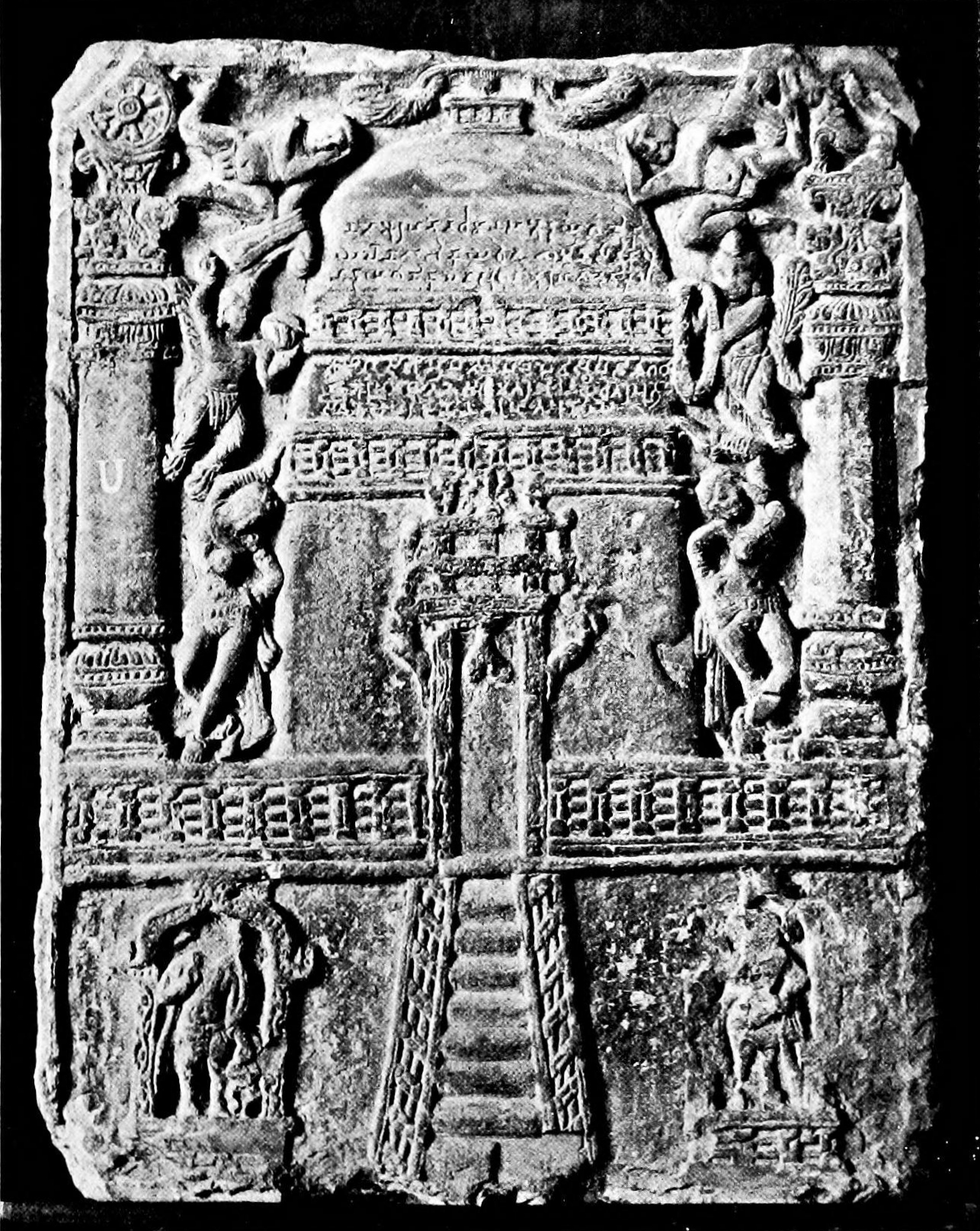
Jain votive plaque with Jain stupa, the "Vasu Śilāpaṭa" ayagapata, 1st century CE, excavated from Kankali Tila, Mathura.
The inscription reads:
"Adoration to the Arhat Vardhamana. The daughter of the matron (?) courtesan Lonasobhika (Lavanasobhika), the disciple of the ascetics, the junior (?) courtesan Vasu has erected a shrine of the Arhat, a hall of homage (ayagasabha), cistern and a stone slab at the sanctuary of the Nirgrantha Arhats, together with her mother, her daughter, her son and her whole household in honour of the Arhats."

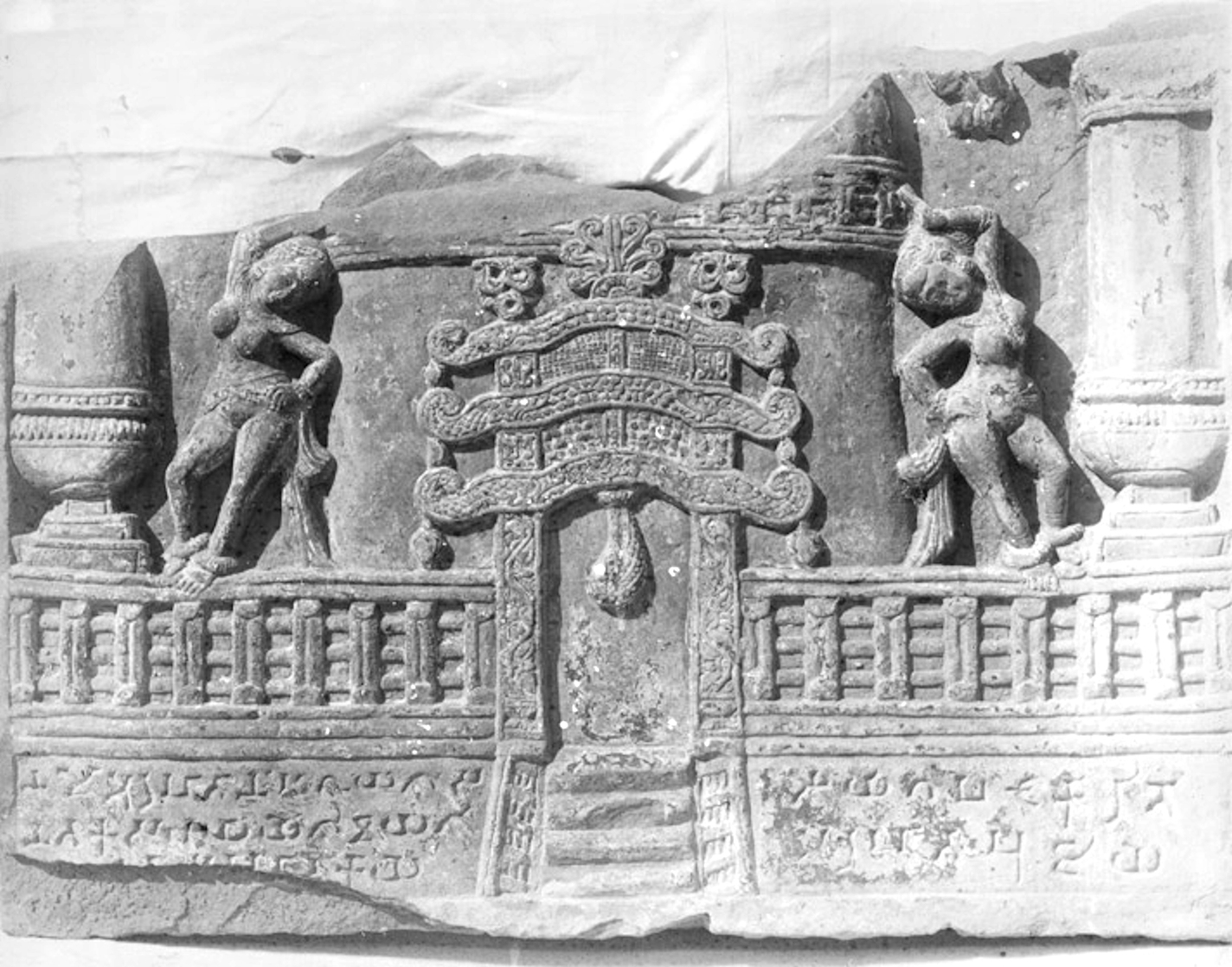
Sivayasa Ayagapata, with stupa fragment, Kankali Tila, 75–100 CE

All four Dharmic religions—Jainism, Hinduism, Sikhism and Buddhism—share concepts and doctrines such as karma and rebirth. They do not believe in eternal heaven or hell or judgment day, and leave it up to individual discretion to choose whether or not to believe in gods, to disagree with core teachings, and to choose whether to participate in prayers, rituals and festivals. They all consider values such as ahimsa (non-violence) to be important, link suffering to craving, individual's actions, intents, and karma, and believe spirituality is a means to enlightened peace, bliss and eternal liberation (moksha).

Jainism differs from both Buddhism and Hinduism in its ontological premises: While all three believe in impermanence, Buddhism incorporates the premise of anatta ("no eternal self or soul") while Hinduism maintains the concept of an eternal unchanging atman ("soul"); by contrast, Jainism incorporates an eternal but changing jiva ("soul"). In Jain thought, there are infinite eternal jivas, predominantly in cycles of rebirth, and a few siddhas (liberated ones). Unlike Jainism, Hindu philosophies encompass nondualism where all souls are identical as Brahman and posited as interconnected one. Jainism rejected the non-dual concept, stating that if there were only one universal consciousness which was already liberated, the purpose of dharma would be nullified. Additionally, the need and desire for an infinitely blissful consciousness to create the universe would imply a limitation within that consciousness. Jainism also criticized Vedanta's inability to explain how an intangible consciousness could create a material universe, filled with countless living beings who experience suffering. Jain scholar Dr. Hukumchand Bharill explains that, according to both Jainism and Vedanta, only consciousness can perceive itself, while the mind and body are incapable of recognizing and experiencing the soul. In Jainism, the soul, in its state of ignorance, mistakenly identifies with the body and consequently experiences suffering. When the soul realizes its true nature, it attains enlightenment, gaining infinite knowledge and bliss. If there were only a singular, universal consciousness, Bharill questions, who attains realization as the consciousness is already liberated, and the mind is incapable of experiencing soul's boundless knowledge-bliss nature.

While both Hinduism and Jainism believe "soul exists" to be a self-evident truth, most Hindu systems consider it to be eternally present, infinite and constant (vibhu), but some Hindu scholars propose soul to be atomic. Hindu thought generally discusses Atman and Brahman through a monistic or dualistic framework. In contrast, Jain thought denies the Hindu metaphysical concept of Brahman, and Jain philosophy considers the soul to be ever changing and bound to the body or matter for each lifetime, thereby having a finite size that infuses the entire body of a living being.

Jainism is similar to Buddhism in not recognizing the primacy of the Vedas and the Hindu Brahman. Jainism and Hinduism, however, both believe "soul exists" as a self-evident truth. Jains and Hindus have frequently intermarried, particularly in northern, central and western regions of India. Some early colonial scholars stated that Jainism like Buddhism was, in part, a rejection of the Hindu caste system, but later scholars consider this a Western error. A caste system not based on birth has been a historic part of Jain society, and Jainism focused on transforming the individual, not society. (Note: According to Richard Gombrich and other scholars, Buddhism too was not a rejection or rebellion against any ancient caste system and it too was focused on individual's liberation from rebirths and suffering. The caste system in Buddhist societies and monasteries outside India have been documented. Gombrich states, "Some modernists go so far as to say that the Buddha was against caste altogether: this is not the case, but is one of the mistakes picked up from western authors.")

Monasticism is similar in all three traditions, with similar rules, hierarchical structure, not traveling during the four-month monsoon season, and celibacy, originating before the Buddha or the Mahāvīra. Jain and Hindu monastic communities have traditionally been more mobile and had an itinerant lifestyle, while Buddhist monks have favored belonging to a sangha (monastery) and staying in its premises. Buddhist monastic rules forbid a monk to go outside without wearing the sangha's distinctive ruddy robe, or to use wooden bowls. In contrast, Jain monastic rules have either required nakedness (Digambara) or white clothes (Śvētāmbara), and they have disagreed on the legitimacy of the wooden or empty gourd as the begging bowl by Jain monks. (Note: Whether the begging utensils of a monk, such as robe and begging bowl, were justified and legitimate for a Jain monk and were not considered an impediment on the path to salvation, remained a bone of contention among various splinter groups within Jainism, and was partly responsible for the ultimate Digambara-Svetambara split, although it would be a grave oversimplification to reduce the roots of the split to just monks' robes and bowls.)

Jains have similar views with Hindus that violence in self-defence can be justified, and that a soldier who kills enemies in combat is performing a legitimate duty. Jain communities accepted the use of military power for their defence; there were Jain monarchs, military commanders, and soldiers. The Jain and Hindu communities have often been very close and mutually accepting. Some Hindu temples have included a Jain Tirthankara within its premises in a place of honour, while temple complexes such as the Badami cave temples and Khajuraho feature both Hindu and Jain monuments.

Fynes (1996) argues that various Jain influences, particularly ideas on the existence of plant souls, were transmitted from Western Kshatrapa territories to Mesopotamia and then integrated into Manichaean beliefs.

== Demographics ==
With an estimated four to five million followers worldwide, the vast majority of Jains reside in India. According to the 2011 Census of India, there were 4.45 million Jains in the country, constituting 0.37% of the total population. The community is highly concentrated, with 78.2% of Indian Jains living in four states: Maharashtra (31.5%), Rajasthan (14.0%), Gujarat (13.0%) and Madhya Pradesh (12.7%). Other states with significant populations include Karnataka (9.9%), Uttar Pradesh (4.8%), Delhi (3.7%) and Tamil Nadu (2.0%). In 2014, the Government of India granted Jainism "national minority" status.

=== Global diaspora ===
Significant Jain communities exist globally, largely tracing their origins to Indian migration. The oldest of these is in East Africa, particularly Kenya and Uganda, where Jain merchants settled in the late 19th and early 20th centuries. Political instability in those countries in the 1960s and 1970s led to a secondary migration, primarily to the United Kingdom, which now has a community estimated at 25,000 to 30,000. The first Jain temple consecrated outside India was in Leicester.

The largest diaspora community is in the United States, with estimates ranging from 80,000 to 100,000, and a significant population also resides in Canada (est. 12,000+) and Australia (5851). A notable community exists in Antwerp, Belgium, where Jains have played a prominent role in the global diamond trade since the mid-20th century. In recent decades, Jainism has also attracted converts in other nations, such as Japan. As of 2015, there were approximately 10,000 Jains in Dubai.

=== Socio-economic profile ===
The Jain community is a distinct socio-economic group within India. Data from the 2015–16 National Family Health Survey (NFHS-4) identified Jains as the wealthiest religious community in the country. This is strongly correlated with high educational attainment. According to the 2011 census, Jains have the highest literacy rate in India at 86.7% (for ages 7+), and this figure exceeded 97% for the population excluding the retired. Jains also have the highest percentage of college graduates of any religious community.

Scholars often attribute this socio-economic profile to the theological principles of the faith. The rigorous observance of Ahiṃsā (non-violence) historically discouraged professions like agriculture, which involve the harming of insects and microbes. This steered the community toward mercantile pursuits, such as commerce, banking, jewelry, and trade. A notable historical example of this financial prominence was the Jagat Seth family, a Jain banking house that served as state bankers to the Nawabs of Bengal and the East India Company in the 18th century.

In the modern era, this focus has translated to high representation in business, finance, and professional fields. Foundational industrialists like Walchand Hirachand, who established India's first modern shipyard and aircraft factory, emerged from the community. In finance, the merchant Premchand Roychand was a key 19th-century founder of the Bombay Stock Exchange. This prominence in large-scale industry continues with contemporary figures such as Gautam Adani, founder of the Adani Group, and the Patni family of Kishangarh, founders of RK Marble, a major global stone processor. This representation also extends to technology and the sciences. Narendra Patni, for instance, was a pioneer of the Indian IT services industry with the founding of Patni Computer Systems. In science, physicist Vikram Sarabhai, founder of the Indian Space Research Organisation (ISRO), is widely regarded as the "father of the Indian space program".

=== Community and philanthropy ===
A defining characteristic of the Jain community is its highly organized and historical practice of dāna (charity). This is a central religious duty for laypersons (śrāvakas), who are motivated by two key theological concepts. Firstly, scholars identify dāna as the primary mechanism for the laity to acquire good karma (punya), which is sought to ensure worldly well-being and a favorable rebirth. Secondly, this practice is the main expression of the householder's vow of Aparigraha (non-attachment). This dual motivation has resulted in a long-standing tradition of institutional philanthropy.

This is most famously expressed in the establishment of panjrapoles (animal hospitals and sanctuaries), which provide care for animals in accordance with the principle of Ahiṃsā. The community has also historically funded and managed dharamshalas (pilgrim rest-houses), educational institutions, and bhandaras (manuscript libraries), which have been crucial in preserving tens of thousands of ancient and medieval texts.

In the 20th century, this philanthropic tradition of supporting educational institutions evolved to include the founding of major national bodies. Industrialist Kasturbhai Lalbhai, for example, was a key co-founder of the Indian Institute of Management, Ahmedabad (IIM-A) and the Physical Research Laboratory. In the field of public policy, physicist Daulat Singh Kothari chaired the influential Kothari Commission (1964–1966), which provided the comprehensive framework for the modernization of India's education policy.

== See also ==
- Outline of Jainism
- Jain law
- Jain cosmology
- List of ancient Jains
- List of Jains
- Nonviolence
- Vegetarianism

== Sources ==
- Journal ..., Anthropological Society of Bombay, 1928
- Alberts, Wanda (2007), Integrative Religious Education in Europe: A Study-of-Religions Approach, Walter de Gruyter, ISBN 978-3-11-097134-7
- Appleton, Naomi (2016), Shared Characters in Jain, Buddhist and Hindu Narrative: Gods, Kings and Other Heroes, Taylor & Francis, ISBN 978-1-317-05574-7
- Arora, Udai Prakash (2007), Udayana, Anamika Publishers & Distributors, ISBN 978-8-179-75168-8
- Arunachalam, M., ed. (1981), Aintām Ulakat Tamil̲ Mānāṭu-Karuttaraṅku Āyvuk Kaṭṭuraikaḷ, International Association of Tamil Research
- Babb, Lawrence A. (1996), Absent Lord: Ascetics and Kings in a Jain Ritual Culture, University of California Press, ISBN 978-0-520-91708-8
- Bailey, William (2012), The Theological Universe, Bailey Publishing, PA, ISBN 978-1-312-23861-9
- Balcerowicz, Piotr (2003), Essays in Jain Philosophy and Religion, Motilal Banarsidass, ISBN 978-81-208-1977-1
- Balcerowicz, Piotr (2009), Jainism and the definition of religion (1st ed.), Mumbai: Hindi Granth Karyalay, ISBN 978-81-88769-29-2
- Balcerowicz, Piotr (2015), Early Asceticism in India: Ājīvikism and Jainism, Routledge, ISBN 978-1-317-53853-0
- Barnett, Lincoln; et al. (1957), Welles, Sam (ed.), The World's Great Religions (1st ed.), New York: Time Incorporated
- Bartley, C.J. (2013), The Theology of Rāmānuja: Realism and Religion, Routledge, ISBN 978-1-136-85306-7
- Basham, A.L. (1951). History and Doctrines of the Ājīvikas: A Vanished Indian Religion. Jainism Series. Motilal Banarsidass. ISBN 978-81-208-1204-8.
- Bauer, Jerome (2004). "Kanji Swami (1890-1980)". In Jestice, Phyllis G. (ed.). Holy People of the World: A Cross-Cultural Encyclopedia. Vol. 1. ABC-CLIO. p. 464. ISBN 9781576073551.
- Berger, Peter (2010), The Anthropology of Values: Essays in Honour of Georg Pfeffer, India: Pearson Education, ISBN 978-81-317-2820-8
- Bhandarkar, Sir Ramkrishna Gopal (1927), Collected Works of Sir R. G. Bhandarkar: Miscellaneous articles, reviews, addresses &c, Bhandarkar Oriental Research Institute
- Billimoria, P. (1988), Śabdapramāṇa: Word and Knowledge, Studies of Classical India, vol. 10, Springer, Springer, ISBN 978-94-010-7810-8
- Boesche, Roger (2003), The First Great Political Realist: Kautilya and His Arthashastra, Lexington Books, ISBN 978-0-7391-0607-5
- Bronkhorst, Johannes (2007), Greater Magadha: Studies in the Culture of Early India, Brill, ISBN 9789004157194
- Butalia, Tarunjit Singh; Small, Dianne P., eds. (2004), Religion in Ohio: Profiles of Faith Communities, Ohio University Press, ISBN 978-0-8214-1551-1
- Caillat, Colette (2003a), Gleanings from a Comparative Reading of Early Canonical Buddhist and Jain Texts, vol. 26, Journal of the International Association of Buddhist Studies
- Champat Rai Jain (1917), The Practical Path, The Central Jain Publishing House
- Charitrapragya, Samani (2004), Sethia, Tara (ed.), Ahimsā, Anekānta, and Jaininsm, Motilal Banarsidass, ISBN 978-81-208-2036-4
- Chatterjee, Asim Kumar (2000), A Comprehensive History of Jainism: From the Earliest Beginnings to AD 1000, Munshiram Manoharlal, ISBN 978-81-215-0931-2
- Clarke, Peter; Beyer, Peter (2009), The World's Religions: Continuities and Transformations, Routledge, ISBN 978-0-203-87212-3
- Cort, John E. (1987), "Medieval Jain Goddess Traditions", Numen, 34 (2): 235–255, doi:10.1163/156852787x00047, ISSN 0029-5973
- Cort, John E. (1995), "The Jain Knowledge Warehouses : Traditional Libraries in India", Journal of the American Oriental Society, 115 (1): 77–87, doi:10.2307/605310, JSTOR 605310
- Cort, John E., ed. (1998), Open Boundaries: Jain Communities and Cultures in Indian History, SUNY Press, ISBN 978-0-7914-3785-8
- Cort, John E. (2001a), Jains in the World : Religious Values and Ideology in India, Oxford University Press, ISBN 978-0-19-513234-2
- Cort, John E (2001b), White, David Gordon (ed.), Tantra in Practice, Motilal Banarsidass, ISBN 978-81-208-1778-4
- Cort, John E. (2010), Framing the Jina: Narratives of Icons and Idols in Jain History, Oxford University Press, ISBN 978-0-19-538502-1
- Dalal, Roshen (2010a) [2006], The Religions of India: A Concise Guide to Nine Major Faiths, Penguin books], ISBN 978-0-14-341517-6
- Dalal, Roshen (2010b), Hinduism: An Alphabetical Guide, Penguin Books, ISBN 978-0-14-341421-6
- Dalrymple, William (2020), The Anarchy: The Relentless Rise of the East India Company, Bloomsbury Publishing, ISBN 9781526634016
- Dani, S.G.; Jain, Surender K. (2002), Mathematics in Ancient Jaina Literature, Springer
- Das, Sisir Kumar (2005), A History of Indian Literature, 500–1399: From Courtly to the Popular, Sahitya Akademi, ISBN 978-81-260-2171-0
- Doniger, Wendy, ed. (1999), Encyclopedia of World Religions, Merriam-Webster, ISBN 978-0-87779-044-0
- Dundas, Paul (2002) [1992], The Jains (Second ed.), London and New York: Routledge, ISBN 978-0-415-26605-5
- Dundas, Paul (2003a), "Jainism and Buddhism", in Buswell, Robert E. (ed.), Encyclopedia of Buddhism, New York: Macmillan Reference Lib., ISBN 978-0-02-865718-9
- Dundas, Paul (2006), Olivelle, Patrick (ed.), Between the Empires : Society in India 300 BCE to 400 CE, Oxford University Press, ISBN 978-0-19-977507-1
- Fergusson, James (1876), A History of Architecture in All Countries: From the Earliest Times to the Present Day, vol. 3, John Murray
- Finegan, Jack (1989), An Archaeological History of Religions of Indian Asia, Paragon House, ISBN 978-0-913729-43-4
- Florida, Robert E. (2005), Human Rights and the World's Major Religions: The Buddhist tradition, ABC-CLIO, ISBN 978-0-313-31318-9
- Flügel, Peter (2002), "Terapanth Śvētāmbara Jain Tradition", in Melton, J.G.; Baumann, G. (eds.), Religions of the World: A Comprehensive Encyclopedia of Beliefs and Practices, ABC-CLIO, ISBN 978-1-57607-223-3
- Flügel, Peter (2005), "Present Lord: Simandhara Svami and the Akram Vijnan Movement" (PDF), in King, Anna S.; Brockington, John (eds.), The Intimate Other: Love Divine in the Indic Religions, New Delhi: Orient Longman, ISBN 978-81-250-2801-7
- Flügel, Peter, ed. (2006), Studies in Jain History and Culture: Disputes and Dialogues, Routledge, ISBN 978-1-134-23552-0
- Fohr, Sherry (2015), Jainism: A Guide for the Perplexed, Bloomsbury Academic, ISBN 978-1-4411-5116-2 PB: ISBN 978-1-4411-6594-7; ePDF: ISBN 978-1-4742-2756-8; ePub: ISBN 978-1-4742-2755-1
- Folkert, Kendall W. (1993), Cort, John E. (ed.), Scripture and Community: Collected Essays on the Jains, Atlanta: Scholars Press, ISBN 1-55540-858-3
- Gombrich, Richard (2012), Buddhist Precept & Practice, Routledge, ISBN 978-1-136-15623-6
- Gopal, B. R., ed. (1973), Epigraphia Carnatica, vol. II: Inscriptions at Sravanabelagola, Institute of Kannada Studies, University of Mysore
- Gopal, Madan (1990), Gautam, K.S. (ed.), India through the ages, Publication Division, Ministry of Information and Broadcasting, Government of India
- Gough, Ellen (2012), Shades of Enlightenment: A Jain Tantric Diagram and the Colours of the Tirthankaras, International Journal of Jain Studies, vol. 8, archived from the original on 30 January 2017
- Granoff, Phyllis (1992), "The violence of non-violence: a study of some Jain responses to non-Jain religious practices", The Journal of the International Association of Buddhist Studies, 15 (1)
- Grimes, John (1996), A Concise Dictionary of Indian Philosophy: Sanskrit Terms Defined in English, New York: SUNY Press, ISBN 0-7914-3068-5
- Hackett, Rosalind I. J. (2008), Proselytization Revisited: Rights Talk, Free Markets and Culture Wars, Equinox Academic, ISBN 978-1-84553-227-7
- Harvey, Graham (2016), Religions in Focus: New Approaches to Tradition and Contemporary Practices, Routledge, ISBN 978-1-134-93690-8
- Hastings, James; Selbie, John Alexander (1914), Encyclopaedia of Religion and Ethics: Confirmation-Drama, T. & T. Clark, ISBN 978-0-567-06509-4
- Hirakawa, Akira (1993), A History of Indian Buddhism: From Śākyamuni to Early Mahāyāna, Motilal Banarsidass, ISBN 978-81-208-0955-0
- Hiriyanna, M. (1993), Outlines of Indian Philosophy, Motilal Banarsidass, ISBN 978-81-208-1086-0
- Hopkins, Edward Washburn (1902), The Religions of India, Ginn & Company
- Ifrah, Georges (2000), The Universal History of Numbers: From Prehistory to the Invention of the Computer, John Wiley & Sons
- Izawa, A. (2008), Empathy for Pain in Vedic Ritual, vol. 12, Journal of the International College for Advanced Buddhist Studies, Kokusai Bukkyōgaku Daigakuin Daigaku
- Jacobi, Hermann (1964), Max Muller (The Sacred Books of the East Series, Volume XXII) (ed.), Jain Sūtras (Translation), Motilal Banarsidass (Original: Oxford University Press)
- Jain, Jyotindra; Fischer, Eberhard (1978), Jain Iconography, vol. 12, Brill, ISBN 978-90-04-05259-8
- Jain, Kailash Chand (1991), Lord Mahāvīra and His Times, Motilal Banarsidass, ISBN 978-81-208-0805-8
- Jain, Prakash C. (2025). Jains in India and Abroad: A Sociological Introduction. DK Printworld.
- Jain, Shanti Lal (1998), ABC of Jainism, Jnanodaya Vidyapeeth, ISBN 978-81-7628-000-6
- Jaini, Padmanabh (1980), Doniger, Wendy (ed.), Karma and Rebirth in Classical Indian Traditions, University of California Press, ISBN 978-0-520-03923-0
- Jaini, Padmanabh S. (1991), Gender and Salvation: Jain Debates on the Spiritual Liberation of Women, University of California Press, ISBN 978-0-520-06820-9
- Jaini, Padmanabh S. (1998) [1979], The Jain Path of Purification, Delhi: Motilal Banarsidass, ISBN 978-81-208-1578-0
- Jaini, Padmanabh S., ed. (2000), Collected Papers On Jain Studies (First ed.), Delhi: Motilal Banarsidass, ISBN 978-81-208-1691-6
- Jambuvijaya, Muni (2002), Piotr Balcerowicz & Marek Mejor (ed.), Essays in Jain Philosophy and Religion, Motilal Banarsidass, ISBN 978-81-208-1977-1
- Jansma, Rudi; Jain, Sneh Rani (2006), Introduction to Jainism, Jaipur: Prakrit Bharti Academy, ISBN 978-81-89698-09-6
- Johnson, W.J. (1995), Harmless Souls: Karmic Bondage and Religious Change in Early Jainism with Special Reference to Umāsvāti and Kundakunda, Motilal Banarsidass, ISBN 978-81-208-1309-0
- Johnston, William M. (2000), Encyclopedia of Monasticism: A–L, Routledge, ISBN 978-1-57958-090-2
- Jones, Constance; Ryan, James D. (2007), Encyclopedia of Hinduism, Infobase Publishing, ISBN 978-0-8160-5458-9
- Jones, Lindsay (2005), Encyclopedia of religion, Macmillan Reference, ISBN 978-0-02-865733-2
- Juergensmeyer, Mark (2011), The Oxford Handbook of Global Religions, Oxford University Press, ISBN 978-0-19-976764-9
- Kelting, M. Whitney (2001), Singing to the Jinas: Jain Laywomen, Maṇḍaḷ Singing, and the Negotiations of Jain Devotion, Oxford University Press, ISBN 978-0-19-514011-8
- Kelting, M. Whitney (2009), Heroic Wives Rituals, Stories and the Virtues of Jain Wifehood, Oxford University Press, ISBN 978-0-19-973679-9
- Keown, Damien; Prebish, Charles S. (2013), Encyclopedia of Buddhism, Routledge, ISBN 978-1-136-98588-1
- Kishore, Kanika (16 June 2015), "Symbol and Image Worship in Jainism", Indian Historical Review, 42 (1): 17–43, doi:10.1177/0376983615569814, S2CID 151841865
- Kulke, Hermann; Rothermund, Dietmar (2004), A History of India, Routledge, ISBN 978-0-415-32920-0
- Kumar, Sehdev (2001), A Thousand Petalled Lotus: Jain Temples of Rajasthan: Architecture & Iconography, Abhinav Publications, ISBN 978-81-7017-348-9
- Lochtefeld, James G. (2002a), The Illustrated Encyclopedia of Hinduism: A–M, vol. 1, The Rosen Publishing Group, ISBN 978-0-8239-3179-8
- Lochtefeld, James G. (2002b), The Illustrated Encyclopedia of Hinduism: N–Z, vol. 2, The Rosen Publishing Group, ISBN 978-0-8239-2287-1
- Long, Jeffery D. (2013) [2009], Jainism: An Introduction, I.B. Tauris, ISBN 978-0-85771-392-6
- Lorenzen, David N. (1978), "Warrior Ascetics in Indian History", Journal of the American Oriental Society, 98 (1): 61–75, doi:10.2307/600151, JSTOR 600151
- Markham, Ian S.; Lohr, Christy (2009), A World Religions Reader, John Wiley & Sons, ISBN 978-1-4051-7109-0
- Matilal, Bimal Krishna (1990), Logic, Language and Reality: Indian Philosophy and Contemporary Issues, Motilal Banarsidass, ISBN 978-81-208-0717-4
- Matilal, Bimal Krishna (1998), Ganeri, Jonardon; Tiwari, Heeraman (eds.), The Character of Logic in India, State University of New York Press, ISBN 978-0-7914-3739-1
- McFaul, Thomas R. (2006), The Future of Peace and Justice in the Global Village: The Role of the World Religions in the Twenty-first Century, Greenwood Publishing, ISBN 978-0-275-99313-9
- Melton, J. Gordon, ed. (2011), Religious Celebrations: An Encyclopedia of Holidays, Festivals, Solemn Observances, and Spiritual Commemorations, vol. 1, ABC-CLIO, ISBN 978-1-59884-206-7
- Melton, J. Gordon; Baumann, Martin, eds. (2010), Religions of the World: A Comprehensive Encyclopedia of Beliefs and Practices, vol. One: A–B (Second ed.), ABC-CLIO, ISBN 978-1-59884-204-3
- Michell, George l (2014), Temple Architecture and Art of the Early Chalukyas: Badami, Mahakuta, Aihole, Pattadakal, Niyogi Books, ISBN 978-93-83098-33-0
- Miller, Christopher Patrick; Long, Jeffery D.; Reading, Michael (2019). Beacons of Dharma: Spiritual Exemplars for the Modern Age. Rowman & Littlefield. ISBN 978-1-4985-6485-4.
- Mishra, Susan Verma; Ray, Himanshu Prabha (2016), The Archaeology of Sacred Spaces: The temple in western India, 2nd century BCE–8th century CE, Routledge, ISBN 978-1-317-19374-6
- Mookerji, Radha Kumud (1988) [1966], Chandragupta Maurya and his times (4th ed.), Motilal Banarsidass, ISBN 978-81-208-0433-3
- Mugambi, J.N.K., ed. (2010) [1990], A Comparative Study of Religions (Second ed.), University of Nairobi Press, ISBN 978-9966-846-89-1
- Mukherjee, Ramkrishna (1955), The Rise and Fall Of The East India Company, Bombay: Popular Prakashan
- Murti, D. Bhaskara (2004), Prāsādam: Recent Researches on Archaeology, Art, Architecture, and Culture : Professor B. Rajendra Prasad Festschrift, Harman Publishing House, ISBN 978-81-86622-67-4
- Nayanar (2005), Gāthā 1.29
- Neelis, Jason (2010), Early Buddhist Transmission and Trade Networks: Mobility and Exchange Within and Beyond the Northwestern Borderlands of South Asia, Brill Academic, ISBN 978-90-04-18159-5
- Nemicandra, Acarya; Balbir, Nalini (2010), Dravyasamgrha: Exposition of the Six Substances, (in Prakrit and English) Pandit Nathuram Premi Research Series (vol-19), Mumbai: Hindi Granth Karyalay, ISBN 978-81-88769-30-8
- Nesfield, John Collinson (1885), Brief View of the Caste System of the North-Western Provinces and Oudh, North-Western Provinces and Oudh Government Press
- Olson, Carl (2014), "The conflicting themes of nonviolence and violence in ancient Indian asceticism as evident in the practice of fasting", International Journal of Dharma Studies, 1 (2): 1, doi:10.1186/2196-8802-2-1
- Owen, Lisa (2012), Carving Devotion in the Jain Caves at Ellora, Brill Academic, ISBN 978-90-04-20629-8
- Pal, Pratapaditya (1986), Indian Sculpture: Circa 500 B.C.–A.D. 700, vol. 1, Los Angeles Country Museum of Art, University of California Press, ISBN 978-0-87587-129-5
- Pande, Govind (1957), Studies in the Origins of Buddhism, Motilal Banarsidass (Reprint: 1995), ISBN 978-81-208-1016-7
- Pandey, Janardan (1998), Gandhi and 21st Century, Concept Publishing Company, ISBN 978-81-7022-672-7
- Pandya, Prashant H. (2014), Indian Philately Digest
- Paszkiewicz, Joshua R. (2024), Indian Spirituality: An Exploration of Hindu, Jain, Buddhist, and Sikh Traditions, Wellfleet Press, ISBN 978-1-57715-425-9
- Pechilis, Karen; Raj, Selva J., eds. (2013), South Asian Religions: Tradition and Today, Routledge, ISBN 978-0-203-07993-5
- Pereira, José (1977), Monolithic Jinas, Motilal Banarsidass, ISBN 978-81-208-2397-6
- Perrett, Roy W. (2013), Philosophy of Religion: Indian Philosophy, Routledge, ISBN 978-1-135-70322-6
- Pope, George Uglow (1880), A Text-book of Indian History, W.H. Allen & Company
- Price, Joan (2010), Sacred Scriptures of the World Religions: An Introduction, Bloomsbury Academic, ISBN 978-0-8264-2354-2
- Qvarnström, Olle (2002), The Yogaśāstra of Hemacandra: A Twelfth Century Handbook on Śvetāmbara Jainism, Harvard University Press, ISBN 978-0-674-00934-9
- Qvarnström, Olle, ed. (2003), Jainism and Early Buddhism: Essays in Honor of Padmanabh S. Jaini, Jain Publishing Company, ISBN 978-0-89581-956-7
- Rankin, Aidan D.; Mardia, Kantilal (2013), Living Jainism: An Ethical Science, John Hunt Publishing, ISBN 978-1-78099-911-1
- Rao, B. S. L. Hanumantha (1973), Religion in Āndhra: A Survey of Religious Developments in Āndhra from Early Times Upto A.D. 1325, Welcome Press
- Raychaudhuri, H. C. (1988) [1967], "India in the Age of the Nandas", in Sastri, K. A. Nilakanta (ed.), Age of the Nandas and Mauryas (Second ed.), Delhi: Motilal Banarsidass, ISBN 978-81-208-0466-1
- Ring, Trudy; Watson, Noelle; Schellinger, Paul, eds. (1996), Asia and Oceania: International Dictionary of Historic Places, Routledge, ISBN 978-1-884964-04-6
- Robinson, Thomas Arthur (2006), World Religions, Hymns Ancient and Modern Ltd, ISBN 978-0-334-04014-9
- Rudolph, Lloyd I.; Rudolph, Susanne Hoeber (1984), The Modernity of Tradition: Political Development in India, University of Chicago Press, ISBN 978-0-226-73137-7
- Salter, Emma (2002). Raj Bhakta Marg: the path of devotion to Srimad Rajcandra. A Jain community in the twenty first century (Doctoral thesis). University of Wales. pp. 125–150 – via University of Huddersfield Repository.
- Salvadori, Cynthia (1989), Through open doors, Kenway, ISBN 978-9966-848-05-5
- Sangave, Vilas Adinath (1980), Jain Community: A Social Survey (2nd ed.), Bombay: Popular Prakashan, ISBN 978-0-317-12346-3
- Sangave, Vilas Adinath (2001), Facets of Jainology: Selected Research Papers on Jain Society, Religion, and Culture, Mumbai: Popular Prakashan, ISBN 978-81-7154-839-2
- Sangave, Vilas Adinath (2006) [1990], Aspects of Jain religion (5 ed.), Bharatiya Jnanpith, ISBN 978-81-263-1273-3
- Saraswati, Dayanand (1908), An English translation of Satyarth Prakash (Reprinted in 1970), Lahore : Virganand Press
- Sethia, Tara (2004), Ahiṃsā, Anekānta and Jainism, Motilal Banarsidass, ISBN 978-81-208-2036-4
- Settar, S. (1989), Ishwaran, K. (ed.), Inviting Death: Indian Attitude Towards the Ritual Death, E. J. Brill, ISBN 90-04-08790-7
- Shah, Natubhai (1998), Jainism: The World of Conquerors, vol. 2, Sussex Academic Press, ISBN 978-1-898723-31-8
- Shah, Natubhai (2004) [1998], Jainism: The World of Conquerors, vol. I, Motilal Banarsidass, ISBN 978-81-208-1938-2
- Shah, Umakant Premanand (1987), Jain-rūpa-maṇḍana: Jain iconography, Abhinav Publications, ISBN 978-81-7017-208-6
- Shah, Umakant Premanand; Dundas, Paul, "Jainism | Definition, Beliefs, History, Literature, & Facts", Encyclopædia Britannica, Encyclopædia Britannica, Inc.
- Sharma, Ramesh Chandra; Ghosal, Pranati (2006), Jain Contribution to Varanasi, Jnanapravaha, ISBN 978-81-246-0341-3
- Shaw, Jeffrey M.; Demy, Timothy J. (2017), War and Religion: An Encyclopedia of Faith and Conflict, ABC-CLIO, ISBN 978-1-61069-517-6
- Shaw, Richard. "Kanji swami Panth". University of Cumbria. Division of Religion and philosophy.
- Singh, Ram Bhushan Prasad (2008) [1975], Jainism in Early Medieval Karnataka, Motilal Banarsidass, ISBN 978-81-208-3323-4
- Singh, Upinder (2024) [2016], A History of Ancient and Early Medieval India: From the Stone Age to the 12th Century, Pearson Education, ISBN 978-93-325-6996-6
- Sinha, Jadunath (1944), Indian Psychology, Motilal Banarsidass, ISBN 9788120801653
- Sogani, Kamal Chand (1967), Ethical Doctrines in Jainism, Lalchand Hirachand Doshi
- Solomon, Robert C.; Higgins, Kathleen M. (1998), A Passion for Wisdom: A Very Brief History of Philosophy, Oxford University Press, ISBN 978-0-19-511209-2
- Soni, Jayandra (2000), "Basic Jain Epistemology", Philosophy East and West, 50 (3): 367–377, JSTOR 1400179
- Sunavala, A.J. (1934), Adarsha Sadhu: An Ideal Monk, Cambridge University Press, ISBN 978-1-001-40429-5
- Sundararajan, K. R.; Mukherji, Bithika, eds. (1997), "20", Hindu spirituality: Postclassical and modern, Motilal Banarsidass, ISBN 978-81-208-1937-5
- Schwartz, William Andrew (2018), The Metaphysics of Paradox: Jainism, Absolute Relativity, and Religious Pluralism, Lexington Books, ISBN 978-1-4985-6392-5, archived from the original on 24 August 2018
- Taylor, Bron (2008), Encyclopedia of Religion and Nature, Bloomsbury Academic, ISBN 978-1-4411-2278-0
- Titze, Kurt (1998), Jainism: A Pictorial Guide to the Religion of Non-Violence (2 ed.), Motilal Banarsidass, ISBN 978-81-208-1534-6
- Truschke, Audrey (1 September 2015), "Dangerous Debates: Jain responses to theological challenges at the Mughal court", Modern Asian Studies, 49 (5): 1311–1344, doi:10.1017/S0026749X14000055, ISSN 0026-749X, S2CID 146540567
- Umāsvāti, Umaswami (1994), That which is (Translator: Nathmal Tatia), Rowman & Littlefield, ISBN 978-0-06-068985-8
- Vallely, Anne (2002), Guardians of the Transcendent: An Ethnology of a Jain Ascetic Community, University of Toronto Press, ISBN 978-0-8020-8415-6
- Vallely, Anne (2013), Bullivant, Stephen; Ruse, Michael (eds.), The Oxford Handbook of Atheism, Oxford University Press, ISBN 978-0-19-166739-8
- von Glasenapp, Helmuth (1925), Jainism: An Indian Religion of Salvation [Der Jainismus: Eine Indische Erlosungsreligion], Shridhar B. Shrotri (trans.), Delhi: Motilal Banarsidass (Reprint: 1999), ISBN 978-81-208-1376-2
- Voorst, Robert E. Van (2014), RELG: World (2 ed.), Cengage Learning, ISBN 978-1-285-43468-1
- Voorst, Robert E. Van (2015), RELG: World (Second ed.), Cengage Learning, ISBN 978-1-285-43468-1
- Vyas, R. T., ed. (1995), Studies in Jain Art and Iconography and Allied Subjects, The Director, Oriental Institute, on behalf of the Registrar, M.S. University of Baroda, Vadodara, ISBN 81-7017-316-7
- Weber, Thomas (2004). Gandhi as Disciple and Mentor. Cambridge University Press. ISBN 978-1-139-45657-9.
- Wiley, Kristi L. (2004), Historical Dictionary of Jainism, Scarecrow, ISBN 978-0-8108-6558-7
- Wiley, Kristi L. (2009), The A to Z of Jainism, vol. 38, Scarecrow, ISBN 978-0-8108-6337-8
- Williams, Robert (1991), Jain Yoga: A Survey of the Mediaeval Śrāvakācāras, Motilal Banarsidass, ISBN 978-81-208-0775-4
- Winternitz, Moriz (1993), History of Indian Literature: Buddhist & Jain Literature, Motilal Banarsidass, ISBN 978-81-208-0265-0
- Yandell, Keith E. (1999), Philosophy of Religion A Contemporary Introduction, Routledge, ISBN 9781134827237
- Zimmer, Heinrich (1953) [1952], Campbell, Joseph (ed.), Philosophies Of India, London: Routledge & Kegan Paul Ltd, ISBN 978-81-208-0739-6

Attribution:

- This article incorporates text from this source, which is in the public domain: Jain, Champat Rai (1929), The Practical Dharma, The Indian Press
- This article incorporates text from this source, which is in the public domain: Jain, S. A. (1992) [First edition 1960], Reality (English Translation of Srimat Pujyapadacharya's Sarvarthasiddhi) (Second ed.), Jwalamalini Trust
- This article incorporates text from this source, which is in the public domain: Jain, Vijay K. (2011), Acharya Umasvami's Tattvarthsūtra (1st ed.), Vikalp Printers, ISBN 978-81-903639-2-1
- This article incorporates text from this source, which is in the public domain: Jain, Vijay K. (2012), Acharya Amritchandra's Purushartha Siddhyupaya: Realization of the Pure Self, With Hindi and English Translation, Vikalp Printers, ISBN 978-81-903639-4-5
- This article incorporates text from this source, which is in the public domain: Jain, Vijay K. (2013), Ācārya Nemichandra's Dravyasaṃgraha, Vikalp Printers, ISBN 978-81-903639-5-2
- This article incorporates text from this source, which is in the public domain: Jain, Vijay K. (2016), Ācārya Samantabhadra's Ratnakarandaka-śrāvakācāra: The Jewel-casket of Householder's Conduct, Vikalp Printers, ISBN 978-81-903639-9-0
- This article incorporates text from this source, which is in the public domain: Tukol, Justice T.K. (1976), Sallekhanā is Not Suicide (1st ed.), Ahmedabad: L.D. Institute of Indology
