= Jain rituals =

Rituals and festivals in Jainism

Jain rituals encompass the daily and periodic religious practices performed by followers of Jainism, deeply rooted in the foundational vows of nonviolence (ahimsa) and physical and mental purity (suddhi). These practices are broadly classified into two primary categories: obligations to be followed (Karyn) and acts of worship to be performed (Kriya). Unlike rituals in many other traditions that seek worldly prosperity, Jain observances—ranging from daily temple worship to annual festivals—are primarily focused on renunciation, karmic purification, and spiritual study.

For the Jain laity, everyday life is governed by six essential duties (avashyakas), which include the practice of equanimity and meditation (Samayika), repentance for any harm caused to living beings (Pratikramana), and various forms of charity (dāna). These ethical obligations extend to strict dietary observances, such as fasting (upavasa), abstaining from root vegetables, and consuming meals before sunset (chauvihar) to prevent harm to microscopic life forms.

Formal worship (puja) is directed toward the tirthankaras (liberated souls), whose qualities are venerated as the ideal state of human spiritual achievement. Worship is conducted through both physical offerings (Dravya puja)—using symbolic articles like pure water, uncooked rice, and sandalwood—and purely mental devotion (Bhava puja). Entrance into a Jain temple (derasar]]) requires strict adherence to physical cleanliness, specific dress codes, and a complete prohibition on materials derived from violence (such as leather or silk), ensuring the sacred space remains entirely uncontaminated. Ultimately, these diverse rituals serve as a disciplined pathway for practitioners to detach from physical desires and achieve final liberation from the cycle of rebirth (moksha).

== Temple etiquette and purity rules ==
Entrance into a Jain temple (derasar or mandir) requires strict adherence to physical purity and nonviolence. These rules are not merely traditional customs, but are grounded in the Jain cosmological belief that external, physical cleanliness is a mandatory prerequisite for the internal, mental purity required for spiritual worship.

=== Nonviolence and restricted items ===
The foundational vow of non-violence (ahimsa) governs all items permitted within the temple complex. Leather goods, such as belts, wallets, and shoes, are strictly prohibited from entering the premises because they are derived from the slaughter of animals. Materials like silk and wool are also frequently restricted or banned due to the violence involved in their traditional production methods. Furthermore, the consumption of food or water is prohibited within the temple. This rule maintains the sanctity of the space and prevents the attraction of ants or insects, which could be accidentally trampled or harmed by visitors.

=== Physical purity and dress codes ===
Jain rituals heavily emphasize a state of ritual purity (śuddhi). Worshippers who intend to perform direct, physical rituals must bathe beforehand and don freshly washed, unstitched garments, which are typically white. These specific clothes are kept exclusively for worship to ensure they remain completely uncontaminated by mundane, everyday activities, such as eating or using the restroom. Men typically wear a dhoti and a seamless shoulder cloth, while women wear unstitched sarees. Casual visitors or tourists who have not bathed or changed into unstitched ritual clothing are expected to dress modestly and cleanly, but they are restricted from crossing into the innermost sanctum or touching the idols.

=== Sanctum protocols ===
The innermost sanctum (garbhagriha), where the principal tirthankara idol resides, is subject to the strictest protocols to maintain its sanctity. Only individuals who have fully adhered to the bathing and unstitched dress code requirements are permitted to touch, anoint, or bathe the idols. When performing rituals in close proximity to the deities, worshippers frequently cover their mouths with a small piece of cloth (muhapatti) or their hands. This practice serves a dual purpose deeply rooted in Jain theology: it prevents microscopic, airborne life forms from being inhaled and killed by the worshipper's breath, and it ensures that the sacred idols are not inadvertently defiled by human saliva or exhaled air.

== Fasting and dietary observances ==
The most visible daily observances for the Jain laity revolve around strict dietary regulations, which are ritualistic extensions of the vow of non-violence (ahimsa). The Jain diet goes beyond standard vegetarianism by excluding root vegetables, such as potatoes, onions, and garlic. According to Jain biology, uprooting these plants destroys the entire plant and harms the dense colonies of microscopic life forms (nigodas) that thrive on the roots. Devout practitioners also observe chauvihar, the practice of consuming all food and water strictly before sunset, as insects and microorganisms are more likely to emerge in the dark and be accidentally ingested or killed during food preparation.

Fasting (upavasa) is a highly venerated ritual observance used for physical austerity and karmic purification. Fasts range from skipping a single meal to abstaining from food for several days, often consuming only boiled water. The ultimate, though rare, ascetic observance is sallekhana (or santhara), a highly regulated vow taken at the end of life to gradually reduce food and liquid intake. Rather than being viewed as a pessimistic act, it is celebrated as a ritual of spiritual triumph, allowing the practitioner to meet death with complete equanimity and detachment from the physical body.

== Six essential duties ==
In Jainism, six essential duties (avashyakas) are prescribed for śrāvakas (householders). The six duties are:

1. Worship of Pañca-Parameṣṭhi (five supreme beings)
2. Following the preachings of Jain saints.
3. Study of Jain scriptures
4. Samayika: practising serenity and meditation
5. Following discipline in their daily engagement
6. Charity (dāna) of four kinds:
  1. Ahara-dāna- donation of food
  2. Ausadha-dāna- donation of medicine
  3. Jnana-dāna- donation of knowledge
  4. Abhaya-dāna- saving the life of a living being or giving of protection to someone under threat

These duties became fundamental ritual activities of a Jain householder. Such as spreading the grain for the birds in the morning, and filtering or boiling the water for the next few hours' use became ritual acts of charity and non-violence. Samayika was used as a word for all spiritual activity including icon worship during medieval times.

=== Samayika ===
Samayika is the practice of equanimity, translating to meditation. It is a ritual act undertaken early in the morning and perhaps also at noon and night. It lasts for forty-eight minutes (Two Ghadis) and usually involves not only quiet recollection but also usually the repetition of routine prayers. The ritual is chanting and also praying about the good things.

=== Pratikramana ===
Pratikramana is performed in the night for the repentance of violence committed during the night, and in the evening for the violence during the day and additionally on certain days of the year. During this, the Jain expresses remorse for the harm caused, or wrongdoing, or the duties left undone.

== Annual and lifetime obligations ==
There are eleven annual obligations for a year and some obligations for once in a life which should be completed by Jain lay person individually or in a group. They are prescribed by Shravak Pragyapti.

=== 11 annual obligations ===
They are following:

1. Deva dravya : Fundraising for temples
2. Mahapuja : Elaborate ritual in which temples and icons decorated and sacred texts recited
3. Ratri-jagarana : singing hymns and religious observance throughout night
4. Sadharmik Bhakti: Deep respect to fellow follower of Jainism
5. Sangha-puja: service to Sangha
6. Shuddhi : confession of faults
7. Snatra puja : a ritual related to Janma Kalyanaka
8. Sutra-puja : veneration of scriptures
9. Tirth prabhavana : promotion of Jainism. by celebrating important occasion
10. Udyapana : displaying objects of worship and participant at end of religious activities
11. Yatratnika or Yatratrik : Participation in religious festivals and pilgrimage to three sites

=== Obligations performed at least once in a lifetime ===
They are the following:

1. Build a temple
2. Celebrate renunciation of a family member
3. Donate a Tirthankara icon to a temple
4. Participate in Panch-kalyanak Pratishtha

== Worship ==
Devapuga means worship of tirthankaras. It is usually done in front of images of any liberated soul (Siddha) such as Tirthankara, or Arihant. In Jainism, the Tirthankaras represent the true goal of all human beings. Their qualities are worshipped by the Jains.

Sthanakavasi oppose idol worship. They believe in meditation and silent prayers. Jain idols are seen as a personification of ideal state which one should attain.

During medieval period, worship of some Yaksha and Yakshini, heavenly beings who are not liberated souls, started. They are believed to help a person by removing obstacles in life.

Elaborate forms of ritual usually done in the temple. Jains wear clean three clothes for many rituals and enter temple with words related to respect for Tirthankara. He bows down to Tirthankara at main shrine and will circumambulate him three times.

Jain form of worship is also called Jain Puja. The worship is done in two ways:

- Dravya puja (worship with materials)
- Bhava puja (Psychic worship, no need of materials)

Jains worship the God, the scripture and the saint.

=== Dravya Puja ===
Dravya puja (worship with articles) includes Ashtaprakari Puja(means eight worships) which is done by paying homage with eight articles in prescribed way. It is also called archana: The following articles are used, in the Jaina Puja:

Puja	Material used	Purpose
Jala	Pure water	Get rid of cycle of life and death, i.e., Moksha
Chandana	Sandalwood diluted in water	Get rid of (metamorphic) heat of this life i.e., Moksha
Akshata	Uncooked rice	To get something which doesn't decay i.e., Moksha
Pushpa	Colored uncooked rice representing flowers or real flowers in some beliefs	Freedom from passions and worldly desires i.e., Moksha
Naivedhya	Dry coconut shell or sweets in some beliefs	Freedom from greed.
Deepak	Colored coconut shell or Lamp in some beliefs	Omniscience, to destroy the darkness of delusions.
Dhupa	cloves, sandalwood powder or Incense stick	To get rid of karmas i.e., Moksha
Fala	Fruits like dry complete almond, cloves, cardamom or even green fruits in some beliefs	Liberation of soul i.e., Moksha
Arghya	Mixture of all of the above	Moksha

The combination of all the eight articles is called arghya. Of these, rice and coconut bits and almonds are to be washed and then all the articles are to be placed in a plate side by side, excepting water which is to be kept in a small pot separately. There should be provided a bowl for the pouring of water, another for the burning of incense, and a receptacle for lighting camphor.

After that some Jains also use Chamara (Whisk), Darpana (Mirror) and a Pankho (Hand fan) also for worship.

=== Bhava Puja ===
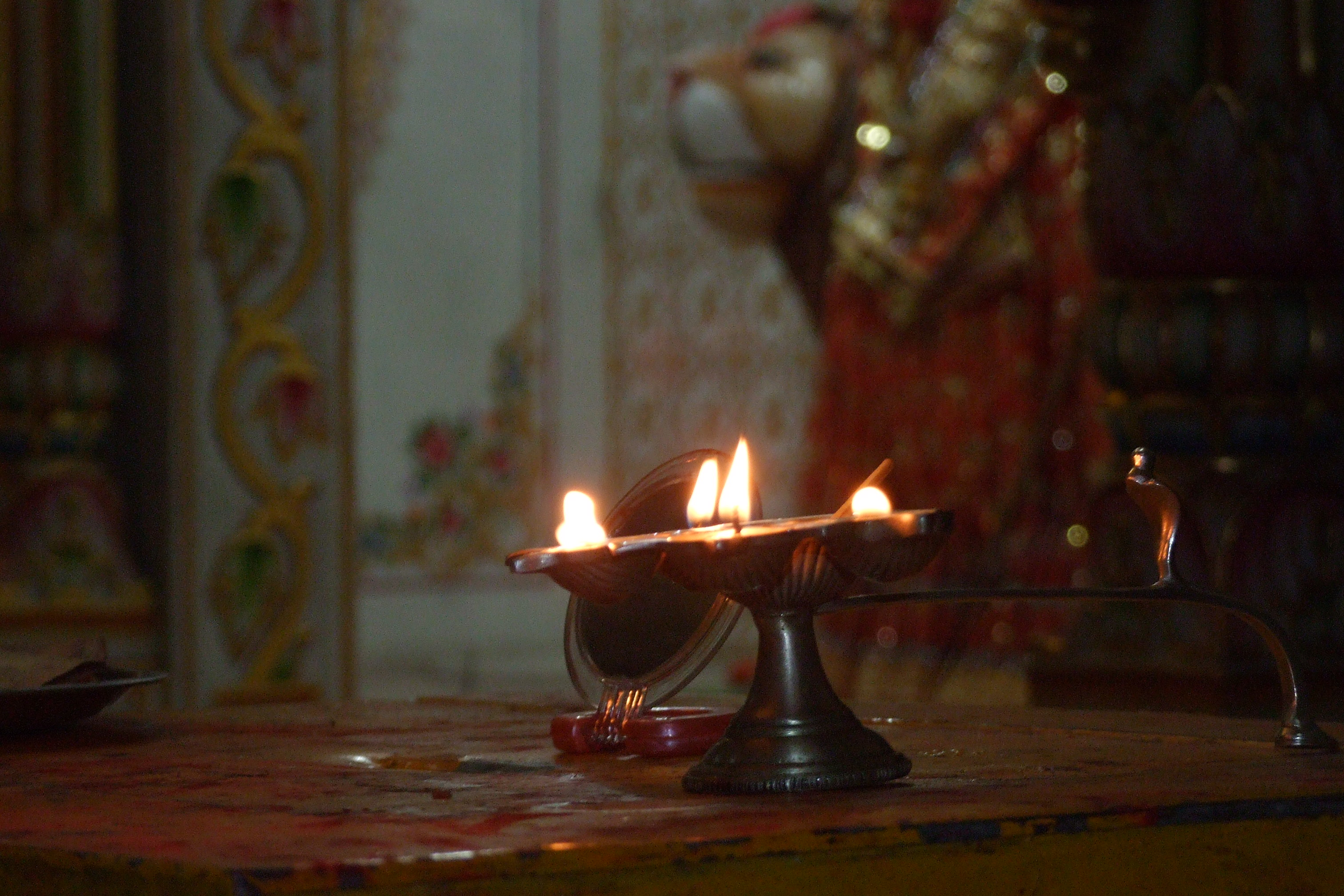
An aarti plate.

Bhava puja(means Psychic worship) is done by ritual called Chaitya Vandana. It includes number of prayers and rituals done in prescribed manner and positions.

=== Aarti and Mangal Deevo ===
Aarti and Mangal Deevo is a lamp ritual waving it in rotational manner in front of icons same as Hindu traditions. Lamps represent knowledge. It is performed everynight at all Jain temples.

=== Other forms ===
Many other forms of worships are mainly performed on special occasions. Some forms of worships have close relationship with these five auspicious life events of Tirthankara called Panch Kalyanaka.

1. Anjana Shalaka: It is a ceremony to install new Tirthankara icon. An Acharya recite mantras related to Panch Kalyanaka followed by applying special paste to eyes of Tirthankara icon. After this an icon becomes object of worship.
2. Panch Kalyanak Pratishtha Mahotsava: When a new Jain Temple is erected, these Five Auspicious Life Events are celebrated known as Panch Kalyanak Pratishtha Mahotsava. After these an icons of Tirthankara gets a status of real Tirthankara which can be worshipped by Jains.
3. Panch Kalyanak Puja:This ritual solemnizes all five Kalyanaka. It was narrated by Pandit Virvijay.
4. Snatra Puja: Snatra Puja is a ritual related to birth of Tirthankara are bathed symbolising Indra doing Abhisheka on Tirthankara on Mount Meru after birth of Tirthankara. It performed before many other rituals and before starting of new enterprises, birthdays.

Others are:

1. Adhara Abhisheka(18 Abhisheka: It is temple purification ceremony. 18 urns of different pure water, herbs etc. used to clean all icons for purification. It is performed periodically.

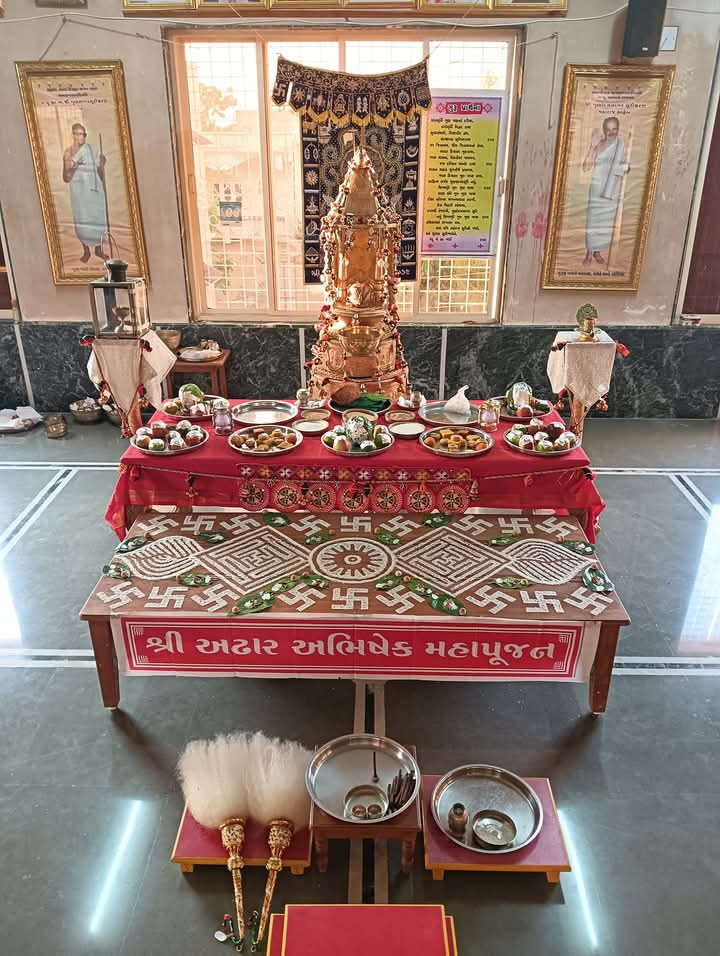
Preparation for Adhara Abhisheka in a Śvetāmbara Jain Temple

1. Antaraya Karma Puja: It comprises a series of prayers to remove those karmas which obstruct the spiritual uplifting power of the soul.
2. Arihanta Mahapujan: paying respect to the arihants.
3. Aththai Mahotsava: It is religious celebration in which various religious activities are performed including some pujans for eight days.
4. Shanti Snatra Puja: It is performed in intention of universal peace. It is related to Tirthankara Shantinath.
5. Siddha-chakra Puja:It is a ritual focused on the Siddha-chakra, a lotus-shaped disc bearing representations of the arhat, the liberated soul, religious teacher, religious leader and the monk (the five praiseworthy beings), as well as the four qualities namely perception, knowledge, conduct and austerity to uplift the soul.

== Annual festivals and life-cycle rituals ==
Jain festivals (parva) generally focus on renunciation, spiritual study, and the celebration of the tirthankaras' lives, rather than the acquisition of worldly prosperity. The most significant annual observance is Paryushana (observed by Śvētāmbaras for eight days) and Das Lakshana (observed by Digambaras for ten days), occurring during the monsoon season. This period is marked by intense fasting, daily temple visits, and the reading of scripture. The festival culminates in the ritual of Pratikramana, where Jains seek universal forgiveness from all living beings for any intentional or unintentional harm caused throughout the year, traditionally expressed with the phrase Micchami Dukkadam.

Other major festivals include Mahavira Janma Kalyanaka, which celebrates the birth of the 24th tirthankara, Mahavira. Jains also observe Diwali, though with a completely distinct theological meaning from Hinduism. In Jainism, Diwali commemorates the exact night that Mahavira achieved final liberation (moksha), and the lighting of lamps symbolizes the preservation of the light of his knowledge.

While ascetic and temple rituals are strictly governed by ancient Jain texts, life-cycle rituals (samskaras)—such as birth ceremonies, marriages, and funerals—are largely adapted from regional Indian customs. Jain weddings, for instance, often incorporate local cultural practices, provided they do not violate the core principles of non-violence and temperance.

Both the Digambara and Śvetāmbara celebrates eight-day observance (ashtahnika) thrice every year. It takes place every four months, from the eighth of bright half of the months of Ashadha (June–July), Karttika (October–November), and Phalguna (February–March) through the full moon and is in direct imitation of the eight day celebrations of Nandishvara Dvipa by the god.

Jains rituals can be separated broadly in two parts: obligations which are followed (Karyn) and worships which are performed (Kriya).

== See also ==
- God in Jainism
- Kshamavani
- Jain cosmology
- History of Jainism
