= Kshama =

Sanskrit term meaning patience or forgiveness

Kshama (Sanskrit: क्षमा, romanized: kṣamā) is a Sanskrit word that is used in Hinduism to indicate forgiveness. Kshama symbolizes forgiveness and forbearance.

Kshama refers to forgiving others for the misdeeds they performed upon oneself, which is why it is related to qualities such as forbearance and compassion. The concept of kshama forms one of the ten traditional yamas (i.e., restraints) that are codified in numerous Vedic scriptures such as the Manusmriti and theVasishtha Samhita. Since Hinduism is a theistic religion, kshama is practiced also to attain the grace of God.

== Etymology and definition ==
Monier Williams, in the Monier-Williams Sanskrit-English dictionary, defines ksama as patience, forbearance and indulgence towards others. The related term ksam, as noted by Monier-Williams, denotes being patient and as is used in reference to the earth.

== Importance ==
Scriptures like the Mahabharata explain that bearing anger leads to one's own destruction, or spiritual decline.

Kshama is often associated with other qualities such as duty, righteousness, forbearance, compassion, freedom from anger, and patience. These qualities are explained in Hindu scriptures such as the dharma sastras and the Shrimad Bhagavad Gita. Living with such qualities leads to positive karma, which bears fruit in this life or in future lives.

Kshama is a component of sreyas, which refers to spiritual progress for both the individual and the community. In the context of sreyas, kshama benefits one's own life, but it also benefits the overall community one lives in.

Hinduism promotes ahimsa (i.e., non-violence). The religion explains that if resentment persists, the intention to harm others out of retribution will also remain. For this reason, kshama is necessary and supports the practice of ahimsa.

The concept of karma, understood as a power of God in Hinduism, explains that those who do bad upon us are simply instruments bringing forth the fruits of karmas priorly performed. One must accept what is brought forth upon them without assigning blame, developing enemies or striving for retribution. Karma also explains that the doer of bad will also experience the fruits of their karmas in the future, without the need for one's own involvement.

== References in Hindu texts ==
Kshama is discussed in several Hindu texts, a number of these references are provided below:

=== Manusmriti ===
- In the Manusmriti, Manu describes forgiveness as one of the greatest virtues and explains its importance to grow spiritually.
- In verses 8:312-313, Manu explains that if a ruler has a forgiving nature, he is rewarded in heaven. He also says, "the learned are purified by a forgiving disposition" (Manu 5:107a).
- Manu explains in the Manusmriti that kshama is one of the ten laws of man. He says:

Contentment, forgiveness, self-control, abstention from unrighteously appropriating anything, [obedience to the rules of] purification, coercion of the organs, wisdom, knowledge [of the surpreme Soul], truthfulness and abstention from anger, [these form] the tenfold law (Manu 6:92).

=== Bhagavata Purana ===
- In Bhagavata Purana, Vyasa describes 40 divine virtues. Kshantihi, also known as kshama, is one of these virtues. Verses 1:16:26-28 states:
  In Him reside (1) truthfulness, (2) cleanliness, (3) intolerance of another's unhappiness, (4) the power to control anger, (5) self-satisfaction, (6) straightforwardness, (7) steadiness of mind, (8) control of the sense organs, (9) responsibility, (10) equality, (11) tolerance, (12) equanimity, (13) faithfulness, (14) knowledge, (15) absence of sense enjoyment, (16) leadership, (17) chivalry, (18) influence, (19) the power to make everything possible, (20) the discharge of proper duty, (21) complete independence, (22) dexterity, (23) fullness of all beauty, (24) serenity, (25) kindheartedness, (26) ingenuity, (27) gentility, (28) magnanimity, (29) determination, (30) perfection in all knowledge, (31) proper execution, (32) possession of all objects of enjoyment, (33) joyfulness, (34) immovability, (35) fidelity, (36) fame, (37) worship, (38) pridelessness, (39) being (as the Personality of Godhead), (40) eternity, and many other transcendental qualities which are eternally present and never to be separated from Him.

=== Mahabharata ===
- In the Vana Parva of the Mahabarata, it is explained:

Forgiveness is virtue; forgiveness is sacrifice; forgiveness is the Vedas; forgiveness is the Shruti. Forgiveness protecteth the ascetic merit of the future; forgiveness is asceticism; forgiveness is holiness; and by forgiveness is it that the universe is held together (Vana Parva, Section 29).

- In the Udyoga Parva of the Mahabharata, it is written, "Righteousness is the one highest good; forgiveness is the one supreme peace; knowledge is one supreme contentment, and benevolence, one sole happiness" (Udyoga Parva, Section 33).
- In the Shrimad Bhagavad Gita, a section of the Mahabharata, Krishna explains to Arjuna, "Forgiveness is one of the characteristics of the one born for a divine state."

=== Other references ===
- In the Ashtavakra Gita, Janaka asks, "Oh lord, how does one attain wisdom? How does liberation happen?" upon which Ashtavakra replies, "Oh beloved, if you want liberation, then renounce imagined passions as poison [and] take forgiveness, innocence, compassion, contentment and truth as nectar."

== Exemplars ==
Many historic figures in Hinduism have exemplified kshama, a few such exemplars mentioned here:

- Rama, an incarnation of Vishnu, forgave his stepmother, Kaikeyi, who caused his exile for 14 years.
- Sita, the incarnation of Lakshmi, displayed kshama when she forgave the demonesses of Lanka who harassed her when she was abducted. She also forgave a crow when it harmed her. This exemplification of kshama shows that one does not need to wait for an apology or for repentance to forgive someone.
- In the Mahabharata, Yudhishthira explains the importance of forgiving his cousins, the Kauravas, for their wrathful behavior on him, his brothers and their wife. He explains that only through forgiveness, can man achieve peace.
- Without a second's delay, Ambarish, a pious devotee and king, forgave Durvasa for his unnecessary anger. It is only through Ambarish's forgiveness that Vishnu repeals his divine disc which was sent to cut off Durvasa's head.
- Tukaram, a 17th century Hindu poet and saint, experienced many challenges but he always remained positive and forgave his offenders.
- Pramukh Swami Maharaj, a modern day Hindu swami, was said to have exemplified the virtues described by Vyasa in the Shrimad Bhagwat Puran throughout his life and he inspired his ascetic disciples to do the same. These virtues include kshama.

== In other religions ==
In Jainism, kshama also relates to forgiveness and is a method to cleansing one's atman (i.e., soul). It is one of the ten spiritual attributes recognized in the religion. Kshama leads to spiritual progress and ultimately, enlightenment. Kshama is inherently an aspect of ahimsa (i.e., non-violence), a key value in Jainism. Every year, Jains celebrate a festival known as Kshamavani Divas, which is a day to ask for forgiveness.

In Buddhism, kshama is defined as forgiveness and forbearance. Kshama encompasses the concepts of the removal of the desire for retribution and the removal of anger. Buddha had mentioned, "all this is suffering," signifying the concept of pain to be just. Kshama is an acceptance of a just world where one accepts the experience of worldly pain and goes beyond the inner feelings of retribution and anger which amplify pain and detract from enlightenment. Perfection in kshama is a quality of the Buddhas and is a goal for Buddhists to achieve.

Jainism and Buddhism are not theistic religions and therefore, kshama is practiced solely for the purpose of self-improvement.

== See also ==
- Forgiveness (Hinduism)
- Shama (Equanimity)
- Dama (Temperance)
- Dhyana (Serenity)
- Ānanda (Happiness)
- Titiksha (Forbearance)
