= Kshamavani =

Jain festival of Digambara sect

Kṣamāvaṇī (Forgiveness Day)
- Official name: Kshamavani Parv
- Observed by: Jains
- Type: Cultural
- Observances: Micchami Dukkadam (Asking for forgiveness), Pratikramana (Introspection)
- Begins: Pratipada, Krishna Paksha, Ashvin; 1st day of waning moon in the month of Ashvin in the Jain calendar
- Date: August–September

Kshamavani (Sanskrit: Kṣamāvaṇī) or "Forgiveness Day" is a day of forgiving and seeking forgiveness for the followers of Jainism. Digambaras celebrate it on the first day of Ashvin Krishna month of the lunar-based Jain calendar. Śvētāmbaras celebrate it on Samvatsari, the last day of the annual Paryushana festival. which coincides with the Chaturthi, 4th day of Shukla Paksha in the holy month of Bhadra. "Micchami Dukkadam" is the common phrase when asking for forgiveness. It is a Prakrit phrase meaning "May all the evil that has been done be fruitless".

== Observance ==
On this sacred day, every member of the Jain community approaches everyone, irrespective of religion, and begs for forgiveness for all their faults or mistakes, committed either knowingly or unknowingly. Thus relieved of the heavy burden hanging over their head of the sins of yesteryears, they start life afresh, living in peaceful co-existence with others. Indeed, this day is not merely a traditional ritual, but a first step on their path to moksha (liberation) or salvation, the final goal of every man's life, according to the teachings of Jainism.

Mahavira said we should forgive our own soul first. To forgive others is a practical application of this supreme forgiveness. It is the path of spiritual purification. Mahavira said: "The one whom you hurt or kill is you. All souls are equal and similar and have the same nature and qualities". Ahimsa Paramo Dharma. Anger begets more anger and forgiveness and love beget more forgiveness and love. Forgiveness benefits both the forgiver and the forgiven.

Forgiveness is the other name of non-violence (Ahimsa) which shows the right path of 'Live and Let Live' to one and all. Forgiveness teaches us Ahimsa (non-violence) and through ahimsa we should learn to practice forbearance.

== Michchhami Dukkadam Prayer ==
Khamemi Savva Jive	I forgive all living beings.
Savve Jiva Khamantu Me	May all souls forgive me,
Mitti Me Savva Bhuesu	I am friendly terms with all,
Veram Majjha Na Kenai	I have no animosity toward any soul.
Michchhami Dukkadam	May all my faults be dissolved.

खामेमि सव्व जीवे, सव्वे जीवा खमन्तु मे, मित्ति में सव्व भू ए सू, वैरम् मज्झ ण केण इ
Khämemi Savva Jive, Savve Jivä Khamantu Me, Mitti Me Savva Bhuesu, Veram Majjha Na Kenai.
सब जीवों को मै क्षमा करता हूं, सब जीव मुझे क्षमा करे, सब जीवो से मेरा मैत्री भाव रहे, किसी से वैर-भाव नही रहे

Kshamavani Parva celebrates forgiveness as a way to a life of love, friendship, peace and harmony. When you forgive, you stop feeling resentful; there is no more indignation or anger against another for a perceived offence, difference or mistake; there is no clamour for punishment. It means the end of violence (Hinsa).

== Samvatsari and Kshamavaani ==
While Samvatsari and Kshamavaani are typically associated with Śvetāmbara sect and Digambara respectively, there is no major difference between the two days and both are observed as Forgiveness Days. Rather, the two are usually used interchangeably.

However, a major difference between the two is that despite both Samvatsari and Kshamavaani falling on the last day of Paryushan, they are in fact two different days. This is because the Paryushan festival for the two sects itself commences on different dates and is of varying duration.

As a result, while Samvatsari is observed on Shukla Panchami of Bhadrapada month by the Śvetāmbaras, the Digambaras celebrate Kshamavani on the first day of Ashvin Krishna month of the lunar-based Jain calendar.

== See also ==
- Forgiveness in Jainism
- Micchami Dukkadam
- Samvatsari
