= Intemperance =

Intemperance may refer to:

- The lack of temperance, a religious concept
- Alcohol intoxication
