= Forgiveness =

Renunciation or cessation of resentment, indignation, or anger

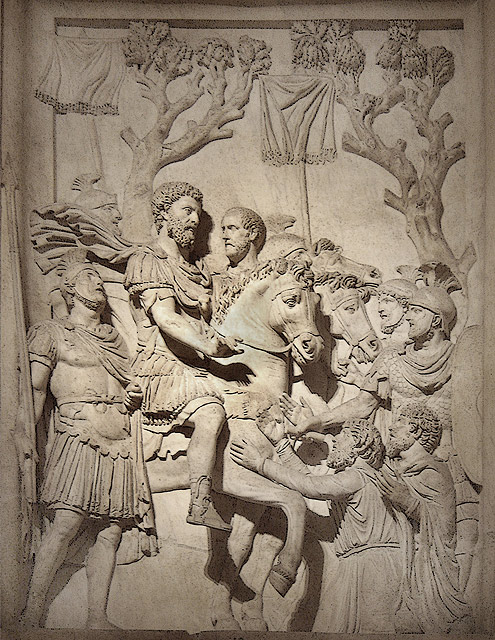
Emperor Marcus Aurelius shows clemency to the vanquished after his success against tribes (Capitoline Museum in Rome)

Forgiveness, in a psychological sense, is the intentional and voluntary process by which one who has felt wronged, harmed, or hurt changes their feelings and attitude towards the offender, and overcomes the impact of the offense, including negative emotions such as resentment or desire for vengeance.

Theorists differ in the extent to which they believe forgiveness also implies replacing the negative emotions with positive attitudes (e.g., an increased ability to tolerate the offender), or requires reconciliation with the offender.

Forgiveness is interpreted in many ways by different people and cultures. As a psychological concept and as a virtue, the obligation to forgive and the benefits of forgiveness have been explored in religious thought, moral philosophy, social sciences, and medicine. Most world religions include teachings on forgiveness, and many of these provide a foundation for various modern traditions and practices of forgiveness.

On the psychological level, forgiveness is different from simple condoning (viewing action as harmful, but to be "forgiven" or overlooked for certain reasons of "charity"), excusing or pardoning (merely releasing the offender from responsibility for their actions), or forgetting (attempting to remove one's memory of an offense). In some schools of thought, it involves a personal and "voluntary" effort towards the self-transformation of one's half of a relationship, such that one is restored to peace and ideally to what psychologist Carl Rogers has referred to as "unconditional positive regard" towards the other.

In many contexts, forgiveness is granted without any expectation of restorative justice, and may be granted without any response on the part of the offender (for example, one may forgive a person who is incommunicado or dead). In practical terms, it may be necessary for the offender to offer some form of acknowledgment, such as an apology, or to explicitly ask for forgiveness, for the wronged person to believe themselves able to forgive.

== Nature of forgiveness ==
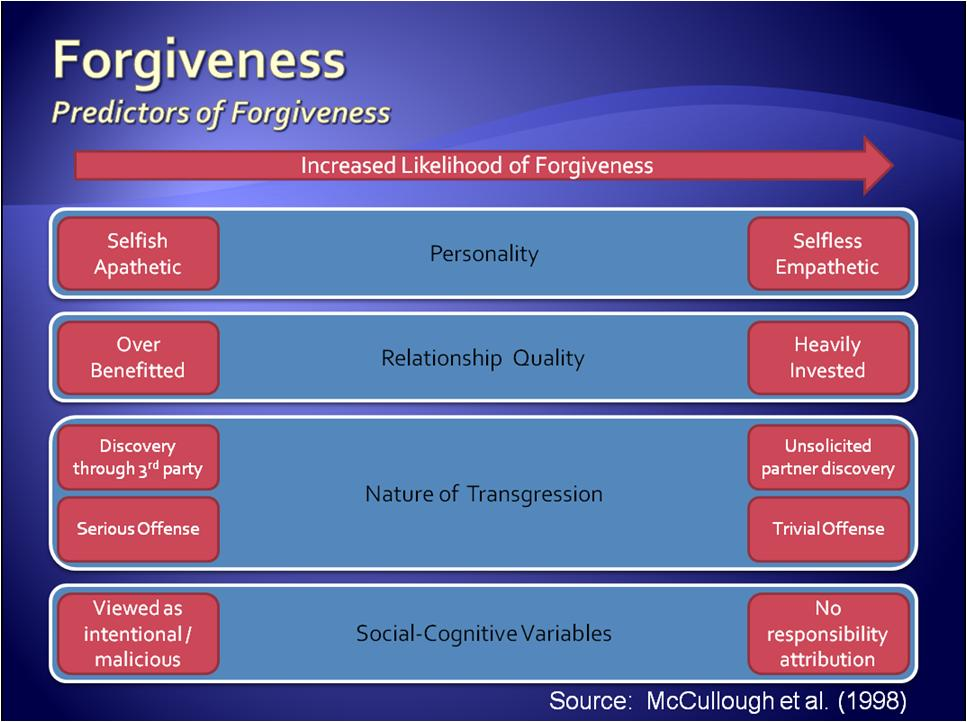
Factors determining the likelihood of forgiveness in an intimate relationship

As of 2006, there is no consensus for a psychological definition of forgiveness in research literature. There is agreement that forgiveness is a process, and several models describing the process of forgiveness have been published, including one from a radical behavioral perspective.

Dr. Robert Enright from the University of Wisconsin–Madison founded the International Forgiveness Institute and initiated forgiveness studies. He developed a 20-Step Process Model of Forgiveness.

In that model, in order to forgive someone, the victim should examine the wrong they suffered, who caused it, and the context in which it happened; consider the anger they feel about it, any associated shame or guilt, and how it has affected them; decide whether they want to advance to an attitude of forgiveness, and, if so, work on understanding, compassion, and acceptance, and make a gesture of reconciliation to the offender; then, reformulate the way they remember the experience of being wronged and of developing forgiveness in order to healthily integrate this into their life story.

A longitudinal study showed that people who were generally more neurotic, angry, and hostile in life were less likely to forgive another person. They were more likely to avoid their transgressor and want to enact revenge two and a half years after the transgression.

Studies show that people who forgive are happier and healthier than those who hold resentment. The first study to look at how forgiveness improves physical health discovered that when people think about forgiving an offender, their cardiovascular and nervous system functioning improves. Another study found that the more forgiving people were, the less they suffered from a wide range of illnesses. Less forgiving people reported a greater number of health problems.

Dr. Fred Luskin of Stanford University, author of Forgive for Good, presented evidence that forgiveness can be learned (i.e. is a teachable, practicable skill) and has powerful, positive health effects. In three separate studies, including one with Catholics and Protestants from Northern Ireland whose family members were murdered during The Troubles, he found that people who are taught how to forgive become less angry, feel less hurt, are more optimistic, become more forgiving in a variety of situations, and become more compassionate and self-confident. His studies show a reduction in experience of stress, in physical manifestations of stress, and an increase in vitality.

In a study conducted in Rwanda to examine discourses and practices of forgiveness following the 1994 genocide, sociologist Benoit Guillou highlighted the extensive range of meanings associated with the term "forgiveness" and its underlying political nature. In the study's findings, Guillou presented four primary aspects of forgiveness to facilitate clearer comprehension of both its applications and the circumstances in which forgiveness can contribute to the restoration of social connections.

=== Ideas about what forgiveness is not ===
Forgiveness does not have to encompass condoning, forgetting, or excusing the transgressor's actions. Additionally, the victim does not have to minimize their feelings of having been wronged in order to forgive, nor do they have to reconcile with the transgressor. The focus of forgiveness is not to deny or suppress anger; rather, its focus is on dealing with resentment. In particular, it is healthy to acknowledge and express negative emotions before one forgives. Forgiveness is also distinct from accountability or justice; punishment and compensation are independent of the choice to forgive, and the victim can forgive or not forgive while still pursuing punishment and/or compensation.

While a victim may have granted decisional forgiveness (refraining from seeking revenge, possibly reconciling), they may not have emotionally forgiven the offender (replacing negative emotions towards them with positive ones) or expressed forgiveness to them. Additionally, expressing emotions may be distinct from genuinely experiencing the emotions (i.e. people can claim one emotional experience while actually feeling something else instead). Although it is heavily debated, emotional forgiveness is generally considered to be for the benefit of the victim and not the offender, unless the victim chooses to involve the offender by expressing forgiveness to them or reconciling. Forgiveness cannot be granted by an uninvolved party.

=== Timeliness ===
Psychologist Wanda Malcolm, in Women's Reflections on the Complexities of Forgiveness, outlines reasons why forgiveness takes time: working on self-care and/or personal healing may take priority (i.e. therapy, medical injuries, etc.); issues of safety may need to be addressed; and facilitating forgiveness immediately after an interpersonal offense may be premature. Malcolm explains, "premature efforts to facilitate forgiveness may be a sign of our reluctance to witness our client's pain and suffering and may unwittingly reinforce the client's belief that the pain and suffering is too much to bear and must be suppressed or avoided."

Worthington et al. observed that "anything done to promote forgiveness has little impact unless substantial time is spent at helping participants think through and emotionally experience their forgiveness".

== In philosophical thought ==
The philosopher Joseph Butler (Fifteen Sermons) defined forgiveness as "overcoming of resentment, the overcoming of moral hatred, as a speech act, and as forbearance". In his 1962 lecture on "Freedom and Resentment"', philosopher P. F. Strawson described forgiveness as "a rather unfashionable subject in moral philosophy" at that time.

== Religious views ==
Religion can affect how someone forgives. For example, one may work towards forgiveness through religious activity, religious affiliation and teachings, and imitation.

=== Abrahamic ===
==== Judaism ====
In Judaism, if a person causes harm, but then sincerely and honestly apologizes to the wronged individual and tries to rectify the wrong, the wronged individual is encouraged, but not required, to grant forgiveness:

It is forbidden to be obdurate and not allow yourself to be appeased. On the contrary, one should be easily pacified and find it difficult to become angry. When asked by an offender for forgiveness, one should forgive with a sincere mind and a willing spirit ... forgiveness is natural to the seed of Israel.

— Mishneh Torah, Teshuvah 2:10

In Judaism, one must go "to those he has harmed" to be entitled to forgiveness. One who sincerely apologizes three times for a wrong committed against another has fulfilled their obligation to seek forgiveness. This means that in Judaism a person cannot obtain forgiveness from God for wrongs they have done to other people. This also means that, unless the victim forgave the perpetrator before he died, murder is unforgivable in Judaism, and murderers will answer to God for it, though the victims' family and friends can forgive the murderer for their grief. The Tefila Zaka meditation, which is recited just before Yom Kippur, closes with the following:

I know that there is no one so righteous that they have not wronged another, financially or physically, through deed or speech. This pains my heart within me, because wrongs between humans and their fellow are not atoned by Yom Kippur, until the wronged one is appeased. Because of this, my heart breaks within me, and my bones tremble; for even the day of death does not atone for such sins. Therefore I prostrate and beg before You, to have mercy on me, and grant me grace, compassion, and mercy in Your eyes and in the eyes of all people. For behold, I forgive with a final and resolved forgiveness anyone who has wronged me, whether in person or property, even if they slandered me, or spread falsehoods against me. So I release anyone who has injured me either in person or in property, or has committed any manner of sin that one may commit against another [except for legally enforceable business obligations, and except for someone who has deliberately harmed me with the thought 'I can harm him because he will forgive me']. Except for these two, I fully and finally forgive everyone; may no one be punished because of me. And just as I forgive everyone, so may You grant me grace in the eyes of others, that they too forgive me absolutely.

Thus, the "reward" for forgiving others is not God's forgiveness for wrongs done to others, but rather help in obtaining forgiveness from the other person.

Sir Jonathan Sacks, chief rabbi of the United Hebrew Congregations of the Commonwealth, summarized: "It is not that God forgives, while human beings do not. To the contrary, we believe that just as only God can forgive sins against God, so only human beings can forgive sins against human beings."

Jews observe a Day of Atonement, Yom Kippur, on the day before God decides what will happen during the coming year. During the Ten Days of Repentance just prior to Yom Kippur, Jews ask forgiveness of those they have wronged during the prior year (if they have not already done so). On Yom Kippur itself, Jews fast and pray for God's forgiveness for their transgressions against God in the prior year. Sincere repentance is required, and since God can only forgive one for the sins one has committed against God, it is necessary for Jews to also seek the forgiveness of those people who they have wronged.

==== Christianity ====
Rembrandt – "The Return of the Prodigal Son"

Forgiveness is central to Christian ethics. Unlike in Judaism, in Christianity, God can forgive sins committed by people against people, since he can forgive every sin except for the eternal sin, and forgiveness from one's victim is not necessary for salvation. The Parable of the Prodigal Son is a notable parable about forgiveness and demonstrates God's forgiveness of those who repent. Hannah Arendt stated that Jesus was "the discoverer of the role of forgiveness in the realm of human affairs."

Forgiving offenses is a spiritual work of mercy. The Catholic Church believes in God's grace of forgiveness of sin and in the necessity of repentance in order to receive said forgiveness.

According to Catholicism, God commands people to pray for forgiveness ("And forgive us our trespasses") because he wants to forgive sin and rejoice over people, as well as for the same reason he grants the graces of contrition and prayer. When God forgives a sin, despite his omniscience, he forgets the sin, and at the particular and general judgments, only unforgiven sins will be judged. Those who refuse said forgiveness at the moment of death commit the eternal sin of final impenitence.

In Catholicism, there are sacramental and non-sacramental ways to obtain God's forgiveness of sin. Sacramental ways include baptism (which forgives original sin, all venial and mortal sin, and all temporary and eternal punishment), confession (which forgives all venial and mortal sin and all eternal punishment), the Eucharist (which forgives all venial sin), and the anointing of the sick (which forgives all venial and mortal sin and all eternal punishment). Non-sacramental ways include the works of mercy and perfect contrition.

Works of mercy can also be offered up for the partial forgiveness of the dead in purgatory, and partial and plenary indulgences can respectively obtain partial and full (plenary) forgiveness of temporary punishment - either for the person who obtains it or for the dead in Purgatory. The Apostolic Pardon is a plenary indulgence that Catholics, dying in sanctifying grace, can obtain for themselves. Divine forgiveness is considered infinitely greater than human forgiveness because it can grant preservative redemption (i.e. the Immaculate Conception of Mary and the fruit of Holy Communion) and purge sin via deification.

Pope Benedict XVI, on a visit to Lebanon in 2012, insisted that peace must be based on mutual forgiveness: "Only forgiveness, given and received, can lay lasting foundations for reconciliation and universal peace". During a General Audience in 2019, Pope Francis encouraged forgiving others as God forgives oneself: "We are forgiven as we forgive others."

==== Islam ====
Islam teaches that Allah is Al-Ghaffur "The Oft-Forgiving", and is the original source of all forgiveness (ghufran غفران). Seeking forgiveness from Allah with repentance is a virtue.

(...) Allah has forgiven what has been done. But those who persist will be punished by Allah. And Allah is Almighty, capable of punishment.

— Surah Al-Ma'idah 5:95

Islam recommends forgiveness because Allah values forgiveness. There are numerous verses in the Quran and the Hadiths recommending forgiveness. Islam also allows revenge to the extent of the harm done, but forgiveness is encouraged, with a promise of reward from Allah.

The reward of an evil deed is its equivalent. But whoever pardons and seeks reconciliation, then their reward is with Allah. He certainly does not like the wrongdoers.

— Surah Ash-Shura 42:40

Afw (عفو is another term for forgiveness in Islam; it occurs 35 times in the Quran, and in some Islamic theological studies, it is used interchangeably with ghufran. Afw means to pardon or excuse for a fault or an offense. According to Muhammad Amanullah, forgiveness ('Afw) in Islam is derived from three wisdoms. The first and most important wisdom of forgiveness is that it is merciful when the victim or guardian of the victim accepts money instead of revenge.

The second wisdom of forgiveness is that it increases the honor and prestige of the one who forgives. Forgiveness is not a sign of weakness, humiliation or dishonor. Rather, forgiveness is honorable, it raises the merit of the forgiver in the eyes of Allah, and it enables a forgiver to enter paradise. The third wisdom of forgiveness is that, according to scholars such as al-Tabari and al-Qurtubi, forgiveness expiates (kaffarah) the forgiver from the sins they may have committed at other occasions in life. Forgiveness is a form of charity (sadaqat). Forgiveness comes from taqwa (piety), a quality of God-fearing people.

Forgiveness is also described in the form of safh (Arabic: صفح). The term can be translated as turning a page or turning the other cheek. It appears several times alongside the terms 'Afw and ghufran.

"But if you pardon, overlook, and forgive 'their faults', then Allah is truly All-Forgiving, Most Merciful."

— Surah At-Taghabun 64:14

==== Bahá'í Faith ====
In the Bahá'í Writings, this explanation is given of how to be forgiving toward others:

Love the creatures for the sake of God and not for themselves. You will never become angry or impatient if you love them for the sake of God. Humanity is not perfect. There are imperfections in every human being, and you will always become unhappy if you look toward the people themselves. But if you look toward God, you will love them and be kind to them, for the world of God is the world of perfection and complete mercy. Therefore, do not look at the shortcomings of anybody; see with the sight of forgiveness.

— `Abdu'l-Bahá, The Promulgation of Universal Peace, p. 92

=== Dharmic ===
==== Buddhism ====
Buddhist scholar, Donna Lynn Brown, states that the kind of Buddhist forgiveness laid out in Buddhist scripture and the kind of Buddhist forgiveness taught in contemporary North America are different. Buddhist scriptures outline a relational forgiveness which involves forbearance and the forgiving of wrongdoers once they have sought atonement. In contemporary North America, Buddhist teachings now advocate for individual forgiveness, removed from the atonement, or lack of atonement, of the wrongdoer. This individualistic interpretation of Buddhist forgiveness is influenced by contemporary psychological practice, as well as a conflation of the terms 'forgiveness' and 'forbearance' when translating texts.

In contemporary Buddhism, forgiveness prevents harmful thoughts from disturbing one's mental well-being. Buddhism recognizes that feelings of hatred and ill-will leave a lasting effect on our mind-karma. Buddhism encourages the cultivation of thoughts with more wholesome effects. "In contemplating the law of karma, we realize that it is not a matter of seeking revenge but of practicing mettā and forgiveness, for the victimizer is, truly, the most unfortunate of all." When resentments have already arisen, the Buddhist view is to calmly release them by going back to their roots. Buddhism questions the reality of the passions that make forgiveness necessary as well as the reality of the objects of those passions. "If we haven't forgiven, we keep creating an identity around our pain, and that is what is reborn. That is what suffers."

Buddhism places much emphasis on the concepts of mettā (loving-kindness), karuna (compassion), mudita (sympathetic joy), and upekkhā (equanimity), as a means to avoiding resentments in the first place. These reflections are used to understand the context of suffering in the world, both our own and the suffering of others.

"He abused me, he struck me, he overcame me, he robbed me"—in those who harbor such thoughts hatred will never cease. "He abused me, he struck me, he overcame me, he robbed me"—in those who do not harbor such thoughts hatred will cease."

— Dhammapada 1.3–4 (trans. Radhakrishnan)

==== Hinduism ====
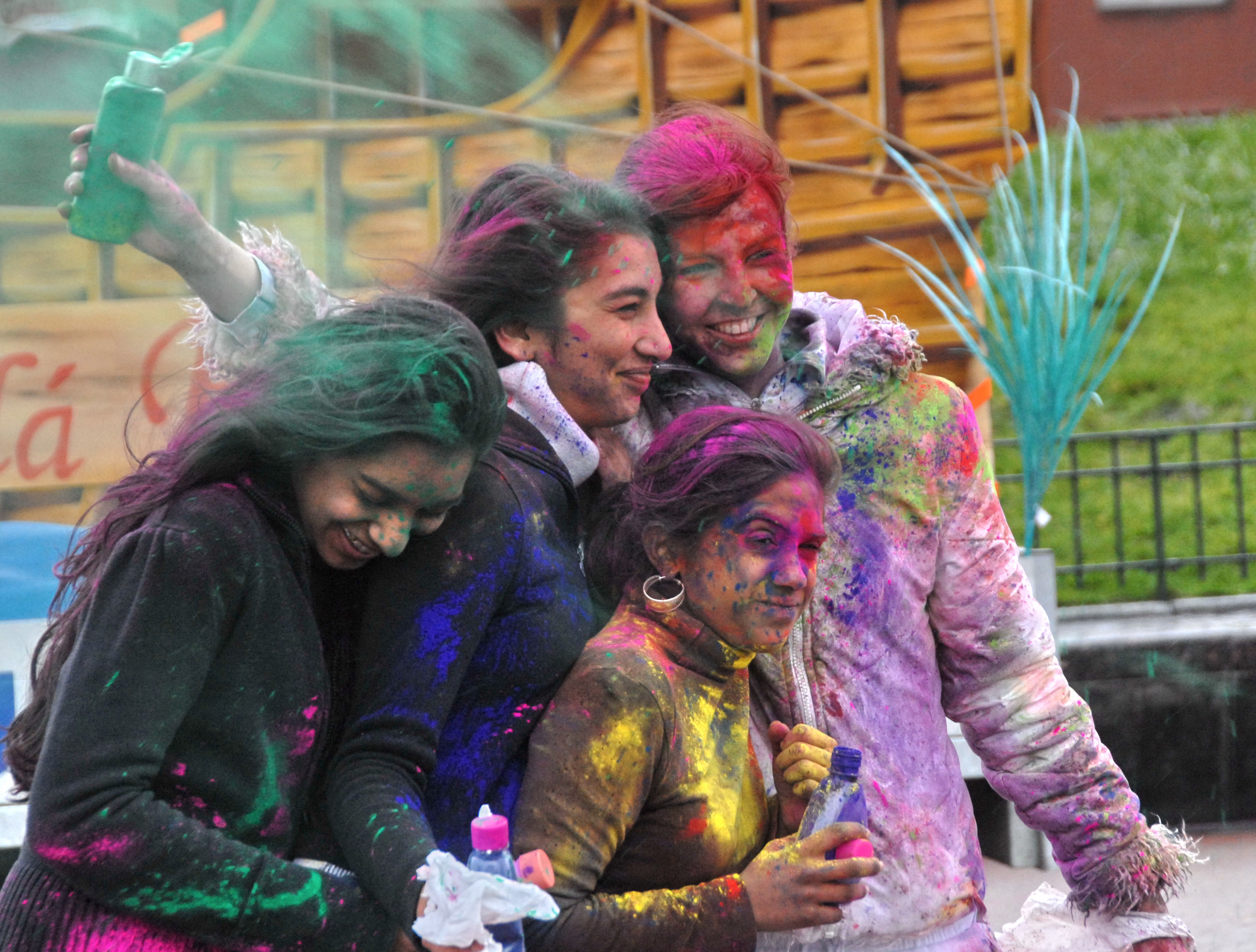
Holi is the Hindu festival of colors, celebrated in spring. Traditionally, this is also a day to mark forgiveness, meet others, and repair relationships. In Indonesia, among Balinese Hindus, Ngembak Geni – the day after Nyepi – is the ritual festive day in spring to meet, and both seek forgiveness and forgive each other.

In Vedic literature and epics of Hinduism, forgiveness is named ksama or kshyama (Sanskrit: क्षमा) along with other compound words. The word ksama is often combined with kripa (tenderness), daya (kindness), and karuna (करुणा, compassion) in Sanskrit texts. In the Rigveda, forgiveness is discussed in verses dedicated to the deity Varuna, both in the context of the one who has done wrong and the one who is wronged. Forgiveness is considered one of the six cardinal virtues in Hinduism.

The theological basis for forgiveness in Hinduism is that a person who does not forgive carries the weight of memories of the wrong, negative feelings, anger, and other unresolved emotions that affect their present and future. In Hinduism, one should not only forgive others, but also seek forgiveness if one has wronged another person. Forgiveness is to be sought from the individual wronged and society at large, by methods including charity, purification, fasting, rituals, and meditative introspection.

Forgiveness is further refined in Hinduism with feminine and masculine forms. The feminine form is demonstrated by Lakshmi (called Goddess Sri in some parts of India) and the masculine is demonstrated by her husband Vishnu. Lakshmi forgives even when the wrongdoer does not repent, while Vishnu forgives only when the wrongdoer repents. In Hinduism, Lakshmi's feminine forgiveness granted without repentance is higher and more noble than the masculine forgiveness granted only after repentance.

In the Hindu epic Ramayana, Sita, the wife of King Rama, is symbolically eulogized for forgiving a crow even as it harms her, and is eulogized again later in the work for forgiving those who harass her while she has been kidnapped in Lanka. Many other Hindu narrative texts discuss forgiveness with or without repentance.

Forgiveness is the subject of extensive debates in Hindu literature. In some Hindu texts, certain sins and intentional acts are argued to be naturally unforgivable (ex. murder and rape). These ancient scholars argue whether blanket forgiveness is morally justifiable, and whether forgiveness encourages crime, disrespect, social disorder, and people not taking others seriously.

Other ancient Hindu texts highlight that forgiveness is not the same as reconciliation. Forgiveness in Hinduism does not necessarily require that one reconcile with the offender, though it does not rule out reconciliation. Instead, forgiveness in Hindu philosophy is being compassionate, tender, kind, and letting go of the harm caused by someone or something else. Forgiveness is essential to free oneself from negative thoughts and to be able to focus on living a moral and ethical life (a dharmic life). In the highest self-realized state, forgiveness becomes the essence of one's personality, and the persecuted person remains unaffected, does not feel like a victim, and lives free from anger (akrodhi).

Other Hindu epics and ancient literature discuss forgiveness. For example:

Forgiveness is virtue; forgiveness is sacrifice; forgiveness is the Vedas; forgiveness is the Shruti.
Forgiveness protecteth the ascetic merit of the future; forgiveness is asceticism; forgiveness is holiness; and by forgiveness is it that the universe is held together.

— Mahabharata, Book 3, Vana Parva, Section XXIX

Righteousness is the one highest good, forgiveness is the one supreme peace, knowledge is one supreme contentment, and benevolence, one sole happiness.

— Mahabharata, Book 5, Udyoga Parva, Section XXXIII

Janak asked: "Oh lord, how does one attain wisdom? how does liberation happen?"
Ashtavakra replied: "Oh beloved, if you want liberation, then renounce imagined passions as poison, take forgiveness, innocence, compassion, contentment and truth as nectar; (...)"

— Ashtavakra Gita

==== Jainism ====
In Jainism, forgiveness is one of the main virtues Jains should cultivate. Kṣamāpanā, or supreme forgiveness, forms part of one of the ten characteristics of dharma. In the Jain prayer (pratikramana), Jains repeatedly seek forgiveness from various creatures—even from single-sensed beings (ekindriyas), like plants and microorganisms they may have harmed while eating and doing routine activities. Forgiveness is asked by saying micchāmi dukkaḍaṃ—a Prakrit phrase literally meaning "may all the evil that has been done be fruitless." During samvatsari—the last day of the Jain festival paryusana—Jains utter the phrase micchāmi dukkaḍaṃ after pratikraman.

As a matter of ritual, Jains greet their friends and relatives with micchāmi dukkaḍaṃ. No private quarrel or dispute may be carried beyond samvatsari, and letters and telephone calls are made to faraway friends and relatives asking their forgiveness.

In their daily prayers and samayika, Jains recite Iryavahi sutra, seeking forgiveness from all creatures while involved in routine activities.

Jain texts quote Māhavīra on forgiveness:

By practicing prāyaṣcitta (repentance), a soul gets rid of sins, and commits no transgressions; he who correctly practices prāyaṣcitta gains the road and the reward of the road, he wins the reward of good conduct. By begging forgiveness he obtains happiness of mind; thereby he acquires a kind disposition towards all kinds of living beings; by this kind disposition he obtains purity of character and freedom from fear.

— Māhavīra in Uttarādhyayana Sūtra 29:17–18

The code of conduct among monks requires them to ask forgiveness for all transgressions:

If among monks or nuns occurs a quarrel or dispute or dissension, the young monk should ask forgiveness of the superior, and the superior of the young monk. They should forgive and ask forgiveness, appease and be appeased, and converse without restraint. For him who is appeased, there will be success (in control); for him who is not appeased, there will be no success; therefore one should appease one's self. "Why has this been said, Sir? Peace is the essence of monasticism."

— Kalpa Sūtra 8:59

=== Other ===
==== Hoʻoponopono ====
Hoʻoponopono is an ancient Hawaiian practice of reconciliation and forgiveness combined with prayer. Similar practices were performed on islands throughout the South Pacific, including Samoa, Tahiti, and New Zealand. Traditionally, Hoʻoponopono is practiced by healing priests or kahuna lapaʻau among family members of a person who is physically ill. Modern versions are performed within the family by a family elder or by the individual alone.

== Popular recognition ==
The need to forgive is widely recognized, but people are often unsure how to accomplish it. For example, in a large representative sampling of American people on various religious topics in 1988, the Gallup Organization found that 94% said it was important to forgive, but 85% said they needed some outside help to be able to forgive. However, regular prayer was not found to be effective for this purpose. The Gallup poll revealed that the only effective mediator was engagement in "meditative prayer".

Forgiveness was a core mechanism of restorative justice programs after the abolition of apartheid in the truth and reconciliation process, among victims and perpetrators of Rwandan genocide, in response to the violence in the Israeli–Palestinian conflict, and the Northern Ireland conflict. This was documented in the film Beyond Right and Wrong: Stories of Justice and Forgiveness (2012).

Forgiveness is associated with the theory of emotion because it draws from a person's emotional connection to a situation. Most people are taught to understand and practice forgiveness at a young age.

== In relationships ==
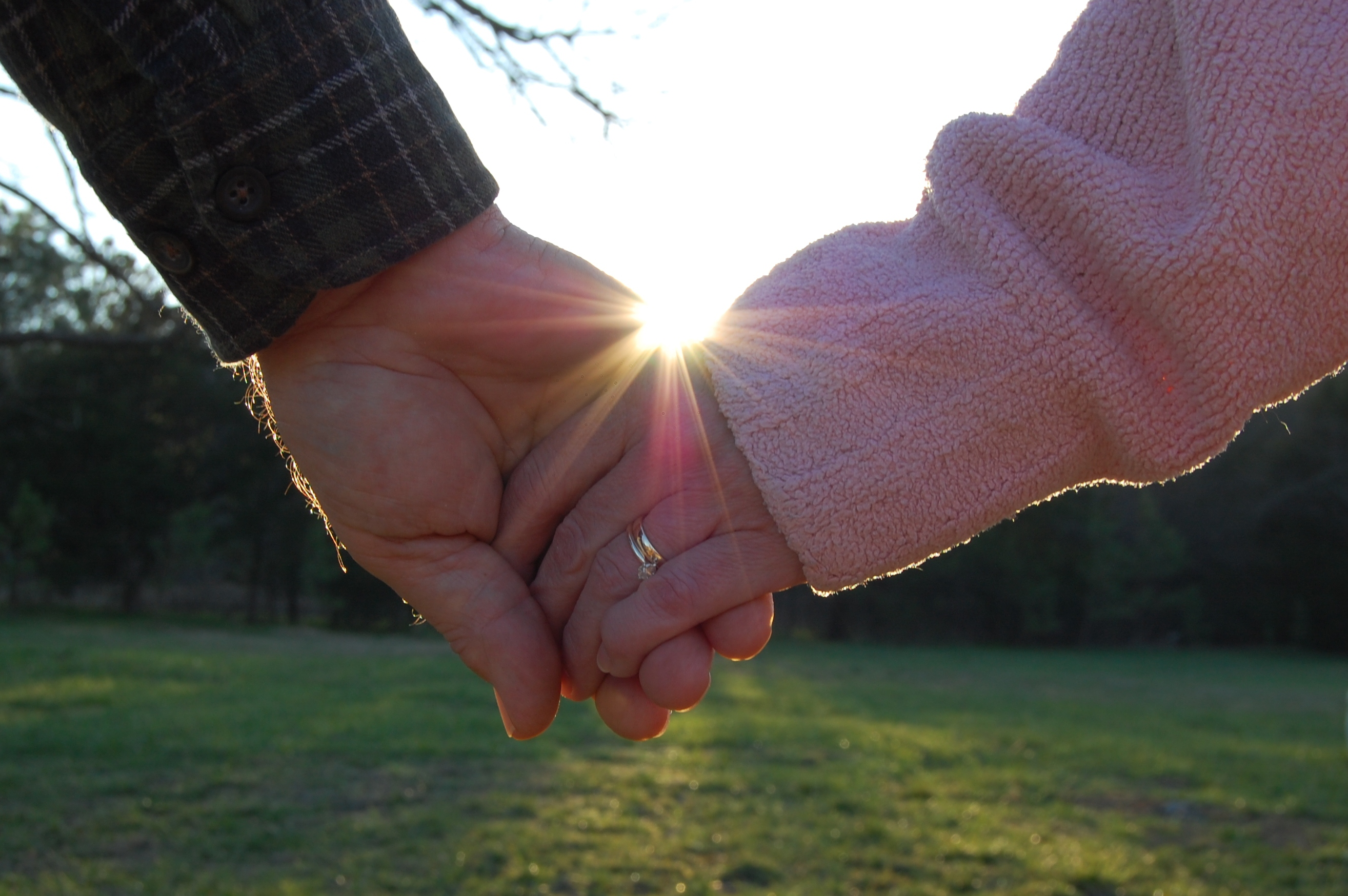
A married couple holding hands, symbolizing forgiveness in marriage

Forgiveness in marriage is important. When two people can forgive each other, this contributes to a happy marriage. Forgiveness can help prevent problems from worsening and aid in conflict resolution. Depending on the severity of the transgression, partners may engage in different communication behavior to seek or grant forgiveness.

In dating relationships (as opposed to marriages), couples are less likely to acknowledge transgressions in the relationship and more likely to forgive each other unconditionally, as well as being more understanding towards their partners. When married couples argue, they tend to focus on who is right and who is wrong.

Merolla distinguished two types of forgiveness: conditional/indirect forgiveness and direct forgiveness.

Direct forgiveness involves discussion of the incident. The forgiving person must be straightforward and clear in telling the offender that they forgive them.

Indirect forgiveness focuses on minimizing conflict. Forgivers do not explicitly tell the offender that they are forgiven, but it is meant to be tacitly understood. This could come from tactics such as humor, eye contact, hugging, or reverting to normal behavior. Therefore, indirect forgiveness is less appropriate following a severe incident and more appropriate for smaller transgressions like minor disagreements or fights.

There is also conditional forgiveness, in which the offender is forgiven with stipulations. The offender may make a deal to refrain from the behavior that might have led to the transgression, such as drinking alcohol.

In a 2005 study, researchers investigated whether forgiveness is important in a marriage, particularly if it accrues before or after an argument as well as its role in broken promises. Researchers found six components that were related to forgiveness in marriage: satisfaction, ambivalence, conflict, attributions, empathy, and commitment.

Sheldon et al. conducted a study in which they surveyed both married and dating couples on past relational transgressions, the communication strategies used to grant forgiveness, the degree of forgiveness within a specific relationship, and the ratings of relationship satisfaction. The severity of the transgression was measured by three different factors and rated on a scale of severity.

Five common strategies of forgiveness emerged and were rated on the frequency of their use. Forgiveness tendency (how likely couples were to forgive) was measured in five aspects and rated on how likely couples were to agree to forgive, and relationship satisfaction was measured using Hendrick's Relationship Assessment Scale. The study showed that in married partners, the tendency to forgive was positively related to the use of minimizing and nonverbal forgiveness strategies. When it came to the severity of the transgression, the likelihood of forgiveness was unrelated to use of any specific forgiveness strategy.

In dating relationships, the tendency to forgive was positively correlated with the use of nonverbal and explicit strategies, as was the transgression severity. Overall, this study showed that both married and dating couples who experienced similar amounts of transgressions did not differ largely in their satisfaction in the relationship after the forgiveness had occurred.

People in a relationship often believe that forgiveness means both parties must forget what had happened. When couples forgive their spouses, they sometimes need help from professionals to overcome the lingering emotions. Researchers described differences between how each individual perceives the situation based on who is in pain and who caused the pain.

The acts and effects of forgiveness can vary depending on the relationship. Between people who are married, friends, or acquaintances, the process of forgiving is similar but not completely the same.

=== Enright's model of forgiveness ===
Enright's model of forgiveness describes forgiveness as a journey through four phases:

Uncovering phase
The person explores the pain that they have experienced.
Decision phase
The nature of forgiveness is discussed. The person commits to try to forgive the transgressor.
Work phase
The focus shifts to the transgressor to gain insight and understanding.
Deepening phase
The victim moves toward resolution, becoming aware that they are not alone, having received forgiveness form others, and finds meaning and purpose in the forgiveness process.

The researchers also came up with recommendations for practitioners to help married individuals communicate with each other, resolve problems, and forgive each other more easily. People should explore and understand what forgiveness means, as preconceived ideas of forgiveness can make couples reluctant to forgive. For example, a conflict may arise if a person does not forgive their spouse out of fear that the spouse might think that they are weak.

== Interventions ==
Psychology researchers agree that the purpose of forgiveness interventions is to decrease the overall negative effect associated with the initial perceived wrongdoing. The incorporation of forgiveness into therapy has gained popularity. The growth of forgiveness in psychology has given rise to the study of forgiveness interventions.

A meta-analysis of group-based forgiveness interventions examined how well they increase self-reported forgiveness (or decrease "unforgiveness"). It concluded that "The data appears to speak clearly: Forgiveness interventions are effective."

=== Types ===
There are various forms of forgiveness interventions. One forces patients to confront the thoughts that prevent their forgiveness with introspective techniques and expressing themselves to a therapist. Another encourages the wronged person to see things from the offender's point of view and try to understand the offender's reasoning. This may allow patients to more easily forgive offenders.

Researchers have studied forgiveness interventions in relationships and whether or not prayer increases forgiveness. One study found that praying for a friend or thinking positive thoughts about that person every day for four weeks increases the chances of forgiving that friend or partner, which leads to a better relationship.

=== Contrary evidence ===
There is conflicting evidence on the effectiveness of forgiveness interventions. Some researchers have taken a critical approach to the forgiveness intervention approach to therapy.

Critics argue that forgiveness interventions may increase negative affect because they try to inhibit the person's feelings towards the offender. This can result in the person feeling negatively towards themselves. The approach implies that the negative emotions the person is feeling are unacceptable and feelings of forgiveness are correct and acceptable. This might inadvertently promote feelings of shame and contrition in the person wronged.

Psychologist Wanda Malcolm states "it is not a good idea to make forgiveness an a-priori goal of therapy". Steven Stosny asserts that victims must heal first and then forgive, and that fully acknowledging the grievance (both recognizing what actions were harmful and naming the emotions the victim felt as a response) is an essential first step before forgiveness can occur.

Some researchers worry that forgiveness interventions promote unhealthy relationships, and that individuals with toxic relationships will continue to forgive those who continuously wrong them, when in fact they should be distancing themselves from those people.

Several studies show high effectiveness rates of forgiveness interventions when done continuously over a long period. However, some researchers have found these interventions ineffective over short periods.

=== Children ===
Some studies looked at the effectiveness of forgiveness interventions on young children, including several cross-cultural studies. One looked at forgiveness interventions and Chinese children, who were less likely to forgive those who had wronged them, finding an effect of such interventions on the children.

=== Older adults ===
Older adults who receive forgiveness interventions report higher levels of forgiveness than those who did not receive treatment. Forgiveness treatments resulted in lower depression, stress, and anger than no-treatment conditions. Forgiveness interventions also enhanced positive psychological states, indicated by factors such as life satisfaction, subjective happiness, and psychological wellbeing. This was regardless of the specific intervention model or format (group or individual).

== Mental health ==
Survey data from 2000 showed that 61% of participants who were part of a small religious group reported that the group helped them be more forgiving. People who reported that their religious groups promoted forgiveness also found more success in overcoming addiction, guilt, and discouragement.

Mindfulness may play a mediator role in the relationship between forgiveness and health outcomes. The beneficial health effects of forgiveness are contingent upon the presence and practice of mindfulness.

Self-forgiveness is an important part of self-acceptance and mental health. Lack of self-forgiveness can negatively affect mental health. Among the elderly, self-forgiveness often involves introspection about past wrongdoings, aiming to prevent their recurrence. When people successfully learn from transgressions, their mental health may improve.

Self-forgiveness can reduce feelings of guilt and shame associated with hypersexual behavior, as well as help individuals reduce negative hypersexual behavior.

Self-forgiveness may be associated with procrastination. Self-forgiveness allows a person to overcome the negative effects linked to earlier behavior and adopt proactive approaches toward similar tasks. Embracing self-forgiveness for procrastination can enhance self-esteem and mental well-being, potentially leading to a reduction in procrastination tendencies.

The self-help book Forgiveness and Health: Scientific Evidence and Theories Relating Forgiveness to Better Health details the benefits and the mental, physical, and psychological results of forgiveness. Stress relief may be the chief factor that connects forgiveness and well-being. Levels of stress go down when levels of forgiveness rise, resulting in a decrease in mental health symptoms.

Forgiveness lifts the forgiver's burden of anger or hatred toward the transgressor, and may lead to better understanding of the transgressor. This improves the forgiver's health and outlook.

A meta-analysis of several controlled studies of forgiveness-oriented psychological interventions tried to determine whether certain classes of intervention helped people to forgive, and also whether this helped their emotional health in general. It found strong support for forgiveness interventions that helped people go through a multi-step process of forgiveness, but no support for forgiveness interventions that were designed merely to help people decide to forgive.

Another meta-analysis examined how forgiveness interventions affected depression, anxiety, and hopelessness, and concluded that "interventions designed to promote forgiveness are more effective at helping participants achieve forgiveness and hope and reduce depression and anxiety than either no treatment or alternative treatments."

== Physical health ==
There have been a number of studies attempting to find a correlation between forgiveness and physical health. Some studies show no correlation while others show a positive correlation.

=== Evidence supporting a correlation ===
People with forgiving personalities tend to experience better physical health. A study focusing on relationships revealed that the level of forgiveness exhibited by individuals had a discernible impact on their physical well-being, regardless of whether they were in positive or negative relationships.

People who decide to genuinely forgive someone also have better physical health. This is due to the relationship between forgiveness and stress reduction.

People who choose to forgive another have lower blood pressure and lower cortisol levels than those who do not. This is theorized to be due to forgiveness and suggests forgiveness is an evolutionarily-selected trait. Forgiveness may reduce hostility (which is inversely correlated with physical health), and lack of forgiveness may degrade the immune system because it puts stress on the individual. Forgiving people may have more social support and less stressful marriages, and forgiveness may be related to other personality traits that correlate with physical health.

Forgiveness may also correlate with physical health because hostility is associated with poor coronary performance. Unforgiveness is a kind of hostility, and forgiveness is letting go of hostility. Heart patients who are treated with a combination of medicine and therapy that includes forgiveness have improved cardiac health compared to those treated with medicine alone.

Forgiveness may also lead to an improvement in an individual's perception of their own physical health. This correlation applies to both self-forgiveness and other-forgiveness, but is especially true of self-forgiveness. Individuals who are more capable of forgiving themselves have better perceived physical health.

People who forgive can have healthier hearts, fewer depression symptoms, and less anxiety. Forgiveness can help mental health, especially with people who have mental disorders. Forgiveness can also improve the immune system.

=== Criticisms ===
Forgiveness studies have been refuted by critics who claim that there is no direct correlation between forgiveness and physical health. Forgiveness, due to the reduction of directed anger, contributes to mental health, and mental health contributes to physical health, but there is no evidence that forgiveness itself directly improves physical health. Most of the studies on forgiveness cannot isolate it as an independent variable in an individual's well-being, so it is difficult to prove causation.

Research into the correlation between physical health and forgiveness has been criticized for being too focused on unforgiveness. Research shows more what hostility and unforgiveness contribute to poor health than it shows what forgiveness contributes to good health. Unforgiving or holding grudges can contribute to adverse health outcomes by perpetuating anger and heightening sympathetic nervous system arousal and cardiovascular reactivity. Expression of anger has been strongly associated with chronically elevated blood pressure and with the aggregation of platelets, which may increase vulnerability to heart disease.

== Self-forgiveness ==
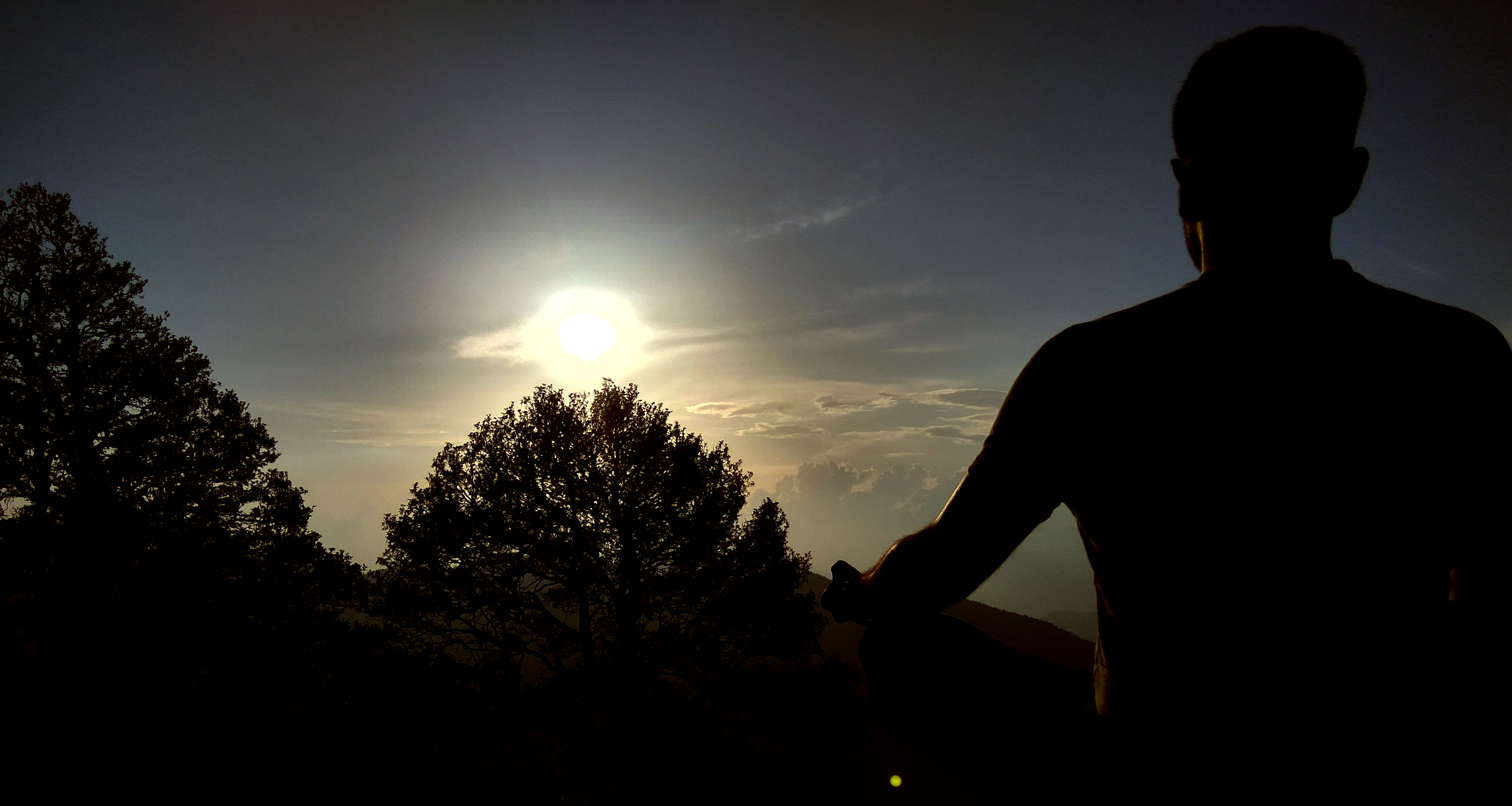
Self-forgiveness is commonly associated with reflection.

Self-forgiveness happens in response to situations in which someone has done something they perceive to be morally wrong and that they consider themselves to be responsible for. Self-forgiveness is the overcoming of negative emotions that the wrongdoer associates with the wrongful action, which can include guilt, regret, remorse, blame, shame, self-hatred and/or self-contempt.

Major and traumatic life events can cause individuals to experience guilt or self-hatred. People can reflect on their behavior to determine if their actions are moral. In traumatic situations, people may self-forgive by allowing themselves to change and live a moral life. Self-forgiveness may be required in situations where the individual hurt themselves or others. Self-forgiveness has a moderating effect between depression and suicidality. This suggests that self-forgiveness (up to a point) is protective against suicide, hinting at possible prevention strategies.

=== Therapeutic model ===
People can unintentionally cause harm or offense to one another. It is important that individuals recognize when this happens and self-forgive in the process of making amends. Self-forgiveness can benefit emotional and mental well-being. The ability to forgive oneself for past offenses can lessen negative emotions, such as shame and guilt, while increasing positive practices, such as self-kindness and self-compassion. However, the process of self-forgiveness may be misinterpreted and therefore not accurately completed. This could lead to increased feelings of regret or self-blame. To avoid this, and to increase the positive benefits associated with genuine self-forgiveness, a specific therapeutic model can be used to encourage genuine self-forgiveness. The proposed model has four key elements: responsibility, remorse, restoration, and renewal:

1. Responsibility is the first necessary step towards genuine self-forgiveness. To avoid the negative effect associated with emotions such as overwhelming guilt or regret, offenders must first recognize that they have hurt another person, and accept responsibility for their actions.
2. Once the person accepts responsibility, it is natural for them to experience remorse or guilt. However, these feelings can be processed and expressed.
3. Restoration allows the offending person to make the necessary amends to the person(s) they have hurt.
4. During renewal, the offending person genuinely forgives themself for their past transgressions and can engage in more positive and meaningful behaviors such as self-compassion and self-kindness.

== Unapologetic forgiveness ==
In some contexts, forgiveness can help someone deal with an offender who refuses to apologize for or even recognize wrongdoings. According to Glen Pettigrove, "the relationship between apologies and the adjectives 'apologetic' and 'unapologetic' is not quite so straightforward." Choosing to forgive someone correlates with whether that person is truly sorry for their actions. Forgiving a person who does not seem remorseful for their actions can be difficult, but it may loosen the grip the person has over the victim. Intrusive thoughts can cause the forgiver to have feelings of low self-worth and to endure a traumatic phase due to the offender's actions. A person may benefit from letting go and accepting what has happened. Letting go does not erase the recognition of what the offender did, but forgiveness can lead to inner peace. Despite the lack of apology from the offender, forgiving them may solve problems and increase self-love for the victim.

Jean Hampton sees the decision to forgive the unrepentant wrongdoer as expressing a commitment "to see a wrongdoer in a new, more favorable light" as one who is not completely rotten or morally dead.

== See also ==
- A Course in Miracles – 1976 book by Helen Schucman
- Anantarika-karma – Five heinous offenses in Buddhism
- Clementia – Roman goddess of clemency
- Compassion – Movement or motivation to help others
- Contrition – Christian concept of repentance for sins
- Eleos – Greek deity of mercy and compassion
- Ho'oponopono – Traditional Hawaiian practice of reconciliation and forgiveness
- Letter of Reconciliation of the Polish Bishops to the German Bishops – 1965 pastoral letter
- Pardon – Forgiveness of a crime by the government
- Regret – Negative emotional reaction to personal past acts
- Relational transgressions – Violation of an implicit or explicit relational rules
- Remorse – Distressing emotion of regret
- Repentance – Reviewing one's actions and feeling contrition or regret
- Resentment – Emotion consisting of a mixture of disappointment, disgust and anger
- Truth and Reconciliation Commission – Commission tasked with discovering and revealing past wrongdoing
- Apokatastasis – Restoration to the original or primordial condition
