= Micchami Dukkadam =

Spiritual phrase in Jainism

Michchhāmi Dukkaḍaṃ (मिच्छामि दुक्कडम्), also written as michchha mi dukkadam, is an ancient Indian Prakrit language phrase, found in historic Jain texts. Its Sanskrit equivalent is "Mithya me duskrtam" and both literally mean "may all the evil that has been done be in vain".

It is used widely in Jainism for the Pratikramana ritual every nine days and also on the last day of Paryushana called Samvatsari in the Svetambara tradition, and Kshamavani in the Digambara tradition. The phrase is alternatively interpreted and said to mean, "May all my improper actions be inconsequential" or "I ask pardon of all living beings, may all of them pardon me, may I have friendship with all beings and enmity with none". As a matter of ritual, Jains greet their friends and relatives on this last day with Micchāmi Dukkaḍaṃ, seeking their forgiveness.

The phrase is also used in Jain monastic practice on a more periodic basis as a part of a monk's or nun's confessional and repentance mantra during the pratikramana (fourth avasyakas) ritual, particularly when they are venerating images or murti of Tirthankaras in Jain temples.

== Etymology ==
The phrase miccha me dukkadam, is an ancient Prakrit language phrase that is commonly found in Jain texts. The Sanskrit version is mithyā me duṣkṛtam. It is related to a section of Jaina monastic code of conduct called the avasyakas (Prakrit: osayas, obligatory observations or duties). It means "may the evil of it be in vain". In the phrase, mithyā refers to 'being fruitless', me means 'my', duṣkṛtam refers to 'bad deeds'.

The Jain scholar Hemachandra gave it a symbolic etymological basis in his Yogasastra verse 3.124, as the following:

- mi is "miu maddava", connoting "gentleness"
- cha is "dosanam chayana", connoting "the veiling of faults"
- mi, me is "a-merae thiya", connoting "abiding in the limitless"
- du is "duganchami appanam", connoting "I loath myself"
- ka is "kadam me pavam", connoting "I have committed sin"
- dam is "devemi tam uvasamenam", connoting "I go beyond it through attaining to calm"

The phrase "tassa micchami dukkadam" has been interpreted in a number of ways, or implied to mean more, from literal to symbolic. Examples include:

- "May that fault have been done in vain [have no effect]"
- "May all my improper actions be inconsequential"
- "My fault has been due to error"
- "May all my transgressions be forgiven"
- "I ask pardon of all living beings, may all of them pardon me, may I have friendship with all beings and enmity with none."

== Literature ==
The phrase michchāmi dukkaḍaṃ is found in the Airyapathiki Sutra, verses 3.124 and 3.130 of the Yoga sastra. The verse is a part of the airyapathiki-pratikramana ritual and prelude to the caitya-vandana (worship in a temple). It contains and ends with micchami dukkadam:

icchami padikkamium iriya vahiyae virahanae gaman-agamane pan-akkamane biy-akkamane hariy-akkamane osay-uttinga-panaga dagamatti-makkada-santana-samkamane je me jiva virahiya eg-indiya be-indiya te-indiya caur-indiya panc indiya abhihaya vattiya lesiya sanghaiya sanghattiya pariyaviya kilamiya uddaviya thando thanam samkamiya jiviyao vavaroviya tassa micchami dukkadam

— Yogaśāstra 3.130

I want to make pratikramana for injury on the path of my movement, in coming and in going, in treading on living things, in treading over seeds, in treading over green plants, in treading on dew, on beetles, on mould, on moist earth, and on cobwebs; whatever living organisms with one or two or three or four or five senses have been injured by me or knocked over or crushed or squashed or touched or mangled or hurt or affrighted or removed from one place to another or deprived of life – may all that evil have been done in vain.

— Translated by Robert Williams

Its Sanskrit equivalent is "Mithya me duskrtam". Equivalent forms of confession and repentance are found in early Buddhist dhamma and Hindu dharma texts. For example, numerous verses of chapter 11 of the Manusmriti are dedicated to confession, repentance and penance. These include those related to willful and unintentional misdeeds, such as those related to injury or killing of other life forms, harming vegetation or forests, consuming forbidden foods or liquids (meat, liquor to Brahmins and monks), theft, and many others. The word dushkrtam in karmic context specially appears in verses 11.228–232. These, translates Patrick Olivelle – a scholar of ancient Sanskrit literature, encourage the person to "declare his misdeed publicly, be contrite", "acknowledge the infraction" before others, sincerely "abhor the evil deed", understand the consequences any misdeeds have "on his afterlife", resolve "I will never do that again", and then "pursue wholesome activity with his thoughts, speech and body", according to Manusmriti.

== Practice ==
Micchāmi dukkaḍaṃ is popularly used on the last day of the annual Jain observations called the Paryushana by Svetambara Jains and Dasa-Laksana-Parvan by Digambara Jains. It is held on evenings during the caturmasa (monsoonal months), usually before one's guru or temple before an image of a Tirthankara. It is particularly popular as a community ceremony on Samvatsari in the Svetambara tradition, and Kshamavani in the Digambara tradition. After pratikramana – confession of and repentance for one's mistakes and violations of Jain code of life for laypeople, a Jain seeks forgiveness from all life forms of the world whom they may have harmed knowingly or unknowingly by uttering the phrase — micchāmi dukkaḍaṃ. In the contemporary era, on Paryushana Samvatsari, Jains reach out to their friends and relatives in person, telephone or mail with "micchami dukkadam".

Paryushana frequently falls in August or September. This annual observation during rainy season for the Jain laypeople is not found in early Jain texts, and appears in post-14th century texts such as the Sraddha viddhi. The early texts of the Svetambara and Digambara traditions include it as a routine, around the year practice for monks and nuns as a part of their avasyakas ritual. It is particularly included when they are venerating images or murti of Tirthankaras in Jain temples. All pratikramana mantras in Jain monastic practice end with micchami dukkadam, wherein the mendicant sets up a category of infractions and errors and then adds "may the evil of it be in vain".

== See also ==
- Kshamavaani
- Forgiveness in Jainism
- Nissaggiya pacittiya (Skt: Naihsargika prayascittika) – Confession, repentance and expiation in Buddhist monastic practice
- Prāyaścitta – Confession, repentance and expiation in Hinduism
