= Titiksha =

Patient endurance of suffering

Tiksha or titikṣā (Sanskrit: तितिक्षा 'forbearance') is defined by the Uddhava Gita as the "patient endurance of suffering." In Vedanta philosophy it is the bearing with indifference all opposites such as pleasure and pain, heat and cold, expectation of reward and punishment, accruement or gain and loss, vanity and envy, resentment and deprecation, fame and obscurity, lavishness and obeisance, pride and egotism, virtue-respect and vice-respect, birth and death, happiness, safety, comfort, restlessness and boredom, affection and bereavement or infatuation, attachment and desire etc. Being entirely responsible for encouragement and/or reproach for ones own personal behaviour, past behaviour, the frame of mind and esteem. It is one of the six qualities, devotions, jewels or divine bounties beginning with Sama, the repression, alleviating or release of the inward sense called Manas. Another quality is Dama, the renunciation of behaviours or utilizing self-control with moderation, with correct discrimination and without aversion.

Shankara defines Titiksha in the following words:

सहनं सर्वदुःखानामऽप्रतिकारपूर्वकम् |
चिन्ताविलापरहितं सा तितिक्षा निगद्यते ||

"Endurance of all afflictions without countering aids, and without anxiety or lament is said to be titiksha." (Vivekachudamani 25)

By speaking of titiksha as endurance without anxiety or lament and without external aids, Shankara refers to such titiksha as the means to inquiry into Brahman, for a mind which is subject to anxiety and lament is unfit for conducting this kind of inquiry. Vivekananda explains that forbearance of all misery, without even a thought of resisting or driving it out, without even any painful feeling in the mind, or any remorse is titiksha.

The practice of Yoga makes a person inwardly even-minded and cheerful. The very act of calming emotional reactions develops a better ability to influence outer circumstances, therefore, titiksha does not make one apathetic or dull; it is the first step to interiorizing the mind, and to bringing its reactions under control. The important way of practising titiksha is to watch the breath (parahara) which practice leads to the practice of meditation proper. Prakrti (matter or nature) shows the way to titiksha, the creative principle of life – just as inertia is a property of matter.
