= Preservative redemption =

Preservative redemption or preservative grace is, in Catholic theology, the doctrine that people can be preserved from future sin and temptation. This doctrine was first developed by Duns Scotus in the 13th century, who believed that the Virgin Mary was preserved from original sin (the Immaculate Conception). This means that Mary was the object of perfect redemption, as if fashioned by the Holy Spirit, which was merited by Jesus. Whether or not Mary was ever tempted is speculated by theologians. The Catholic Church has developed the doctrine of preservative redemption to include the Eucharist, teaching ever since the Council of Trent that a fruit of Holy Communion is preservation from future temptation and future mortal sin. This is because the soul is enkindled with divine love, so that the more of Jesus one receives the harder it becomes for one to be tempted and commit sin. A commonly held pious opinion is that the prophet Jeremiah, John the Baptist, and according to some St. Joseph were sanctified from original sin in the womb, but not at their conception. Saint Faustina claimed to have received the grace of freedom from temptation against purity. Criticism of preservative grace includes asking why God does not make every human and angel sinless and how the Immaculate Conception makes sense if Mary is not redeemed from original sin.

== Catholic Church ==
=== Official teaching ===
==== Immaculate Conception ====
The Council of Trent, in Canon XXIII of Session VI, teaches the Immaculate Conception. The Immaculate Conception of Mary is the dogma that the Mother of God enjoyed the grace and privilege of freedom from original sin and personal sin since the moment of her conception. This means that Mary was the object of perfect redemption, as if fashioned by the Holy Spirit, which was merited by Jesus. Whether or not Mary was ever tempted is speculated by theologians.

==== Holy Communion ====
When a Catholic receives the Eucharist worthily (free from mortal sin, i.e., in sanctifying grace), among the fruits received is preservation from future temptation and from future mortal sin. This is because the Eucharist enkindles divine love in the soul, so that the more a person receives Jesus the harder it becomes to be tempted and commit sin.

=== Unofficial teaching ===
==== Pious Opinion ====
A commonly held pious opinion is that the prophet Jeremiah, John the Baptist, and according to some St. Joseph were sanctified from original sin in the womb, but not at their conception.

==== Private Revelation ====
Saint Faustina claimed that Jesus told her she "will never be subject to temptations against purity."

== Criticism ==
A criticism is how the Immaculate Conception can make sense if redemption requires a person to be redeemed from original sin, rather than original sin being prevented altogether.

== See also ==
- Prevenient grace
