= Samvatsari =

Last day of Paryushana for the Shvetambara sect of Jainism

- The Jain flag in India
- Official name: Samvatsari Pajushan
- Also called: Forgiveness Day
- Observed by: Śvetāmbara sect of Jains worldwide
- Liturgical color: White
- Type: Jain
- Significance: Last day of Paryushan festival, on which Jains forgive and seek forgiveness from all living beings
- Celebrations: 1 day
- Observances: Micchami Dukkadam (Asking for forgiveness), Pratikramana (Introspection)
- Date: Bhadrapada Shukla Panchami
- Frequency: Annual
- Related to: Paryushan, Kshamavani

Saṃvatsari (Sanskrit: संवत्सरी) (lit. Annual Day or fig. Forgiveness Day) is the last day of Paryushana according to the Śvetāmbara sect of Jainism. It falls on Shukla Choth each year in the Jain calendar month of Bhadrapada, somewhere between the middle of August and September in the Gregorian calendar.

On this day, Jains forgive and seek forgiveness for their mistakes committed, knowingly or unknowingly, on all the living beings. A yearly, elaborate penitential retreat called "samvatsari pratikramana" is performed on this day. After the pratikramana, Jains seek forgiveness from all the creatures of the world, including friends and relatives by uttering the phrase — Micchami Dukkadam or its variants like "Khamau Sa", "Uttam Kshama" or "Khamat Khamna". These phrases literally mean, "I am sorry, please forgive me." Samvatsari is the last day of an 8 day long festival called Paryushana. In Paryushana, Jains fast and visit the temple.

== Etymology ==
Samvatsari is derived Sanskrit language. Samvatsara refers to a "year" in Vedic literature such as the Rigveda and other ancient texts. Thus, Samvatsari literally refers to a day that comes annually.

== Customs and Traditions ==
As a matter of ritual, they personally greet their friends and relatives Micchami Dukkadam. No private quarrel or dispute may be carried beyond Saṃvatsarī and messages, telephone calls are made to the outstation friends and relatives, asking their forgiveness.

Being the holiest day of the Jain calendar, many Jains observe a complete fast on this day.

== Samvatsari and Kshamavani ==
While Samvatsari and Kshamavani are typically associated with Śvetāmbara sect and Digambara respectively, there is no major difference between the two days and both are observed as Forgiveness Days. Rather, the two are usually used interchangeably.

However, a major difference between the two is that despite both Samvatsari and Kshamavani falling on the last day of Paryushan, they are in fact two different days. This is because the Paryushan festival for the two sects itself commences on different dates and is of varying duration.

As a result, while Samvatsari is observed on Shukla Chaturthi of Bhadrapada month by the Śvetāmbaras, the Digambaras celebrate it on the first day of Ashvin Krishna month of the lunar-based Jain calendar.

== See also ==
- Paryushan
- Kshamavani
- Forgiveness in Jainism
- Kshamavani
