= Sāmāyika =

Vow of periodic concentration in Jainism

Sāmāyika is the second siksavrata (ritual restraint) in Jainism, (Note: The first is desavakasika (staying in a restrained surrounding, cutting down worldly activities). The third is posadhopavasa (fasting on the 8th and 14th days on lunar waxing and waning cycles). The fourth is dana (giving alms to Jain monks, nuns or spiritual people).) and one of the essential duties prescribed for both the Śrāvaka (householders) and ascetics. It is commonly interpreted as a practice of "brief periods in meditation," to achieve equanimity, but connotes more than meditation. According to Dundas, samayika seems to have meant "correct behavior" in early Jainism, and for a Jain householder is the voluntary ritual practice of "assuming temporary ascetic status".

== Etymology ==
The name Sāmāyika is derived from the term samaya "time" in Prakrit. According to Dundas, samayika seems to have meant "correct behavior" in early Jainism.

Jains use samayika to denote the practice of meditation. According to Achārya Pujyapada's Sarvārthasiddhi:

The preposition ‘sam’ means one state of being. For instance, ghee becomes one with the thing mixed. To become one is samaya. That, which has oneness as its object, is sāmāyikam.

== Texts ==
According to the Jain text, Purushartha Siddhyupaya (95):

After renouncing all attachments and aversions, and adopting a sense of equanimity in all objects, one should practise, many times, periodic concentration (sāmāyika), the principal means to realize the true nature of the Self.

The Puruşārthasiddhyupāya further states:

For the sake of strengthening the performance of daily meditation (sāmāyika), one must undertake fasting twice each lunar fortnight (proşadhopavāsa).

According to the Jain text, Ratnakaranda śrāvakācāra (104), while performing sāmayika, one should meditate on:

"I am involved in the saṃsāra (cycle of transmigration) in which there is no protection for souls, which is inauspicious, transitory and full of pain, and of the nature of not-Self; moksha is the opposite of this"-thus should one meditate while performing sāmayika.

== Practice ==
=== Aim ===
According to Padmanabh Jaini, sāmāyika is a practice of "brief periods in meditation" in Jainism that is a part of siksavrata (ritual restraint). The goal of Sāmāyika is to achieve equanimity, and it is the second siksavrata.

According to Johnson, as well as Jaini, samayika connotes more than meditation, and for a Jain householder is the voluntary ritual practice of "assuming temporary ascetic status".

According to Champat Rai Jain, sāmāyika aims at perfection in conduct and complete renunciation, and is "the sole and the immediate cause of salvation." (Note: Champat Rai Jain: "Sāmāyika aims at the attainment of divinity through perfection in conduct, which, consisting, as it does, in the purest and most complete form of renunciation, is the sole and the immediate cause of salvation, that is of wholeness and freedom from the pain and misery of saṃsāra (births and deaths).")

Sāmāyika is also one of the five kinds of conduct (cāritra) other kinds being reinitiation, purity of non-injury, slight passion and perfect conduct. It is of two kinds — with and without time limit.

=== Procedure ===
The sāmāyika is performed for an antara-muhurta (about 48 minutes) every day. According to Champat Rai Jain, householders perform the sāmāyika one to three times a day, "gradually extending its duration also from one antaramuhurta to three times as much at each sitting." (Note: Champat Rai Jain: "The layman who has just entered the path observes the sāmāyika meditation but once daily in the morning, for he is not able to tear himself away from business and pleasure at that early stage in his spiritual career to be able to perform it more often; but as he progresses onwards, he takes to its observance three times – morning, noon and evening – every day, gradually extending its duration also from one antaramuhurta to three times as much at each sitting.")

The posture for sāmāyika may be either

1. padma āsana, the sitting posture, with inter-locked legs (the right one placed on the left thigh and the left on the right), the hands placed in the lap with the palms facing upwards (the right one being on the top), and with attention fixed on the foremost point of the nose;
2. khadga āsana, the standing posture, with feet at a distance of about two inches from each other, the hands resting naturally by the sides, but not so as to touch the body; and attention fixed on the point of the nose as in the padma āsana; or
3. ardha padma āsana or the semi-padma posture, which differs from the padma in respect of the position of the left leg, which is placed under the right thigh.

Facing north or east the śrāvaka bows to the Pañca-Parameṣṭhi. He then recites the Namokara mantra a certain number of times, and finally devotes himself to holy meditation. This consists in:

- pratikramana, recounting the sins committed and repenting for them,
- pratyākhyanā, resolving to avoid particular sins in future,
- sāmāyika karma, renunciation of personal attachments, and the cultivation of a feeling of regarding every body and thing alike,
- stuti, praising the four and twenty Tīrthankaras,
- vandanā, devotion to a particular Tirthankara, and
- kāyotsarga, withdrawal of attention from the body (physical personality) and becoming absorbed in the contemplation of the spiritual Self.

Sāmayika can be performed anywhere, at a temple, private residence, forest and the like, but shouldn't be open to disturbance.

=== Householders ===
A layperson includes samayika ritual with other ritual practices such as Puja in a Jain temple and doing charity work. In Jainism, six essential duties are prescribed for a śrāvaka (householder), out of which one duty is Samayika. These help the laity in achieving the principle of ahimsa which is necessary for his/her spiritual upliftment. The sāmayika vrata (vow to meditate) is intended to be observed three times a day if possible; other-wise at least once daily. Its objective is to enable the śrāvaka to abstain from all kinds of sins during the period of time fixed for its observance. The usual duration of the sāmayika vow is an antara mūharta (a period of time not exceeding 48 minutes).

During this period, which the layman spends in study and meditation, he vows to refrain from the commission of the five kinds of sin — injury, falsehood, theft, unchastity and love of material possessions in any of the three ways. These three ways are:-

- by an act of mind, speech or body (krita),
- inciting others to commit such an act (kārita),
- approving the commission of such an act by others (anumodanā).

The householders, due to the absence of all sinful activities during the period of meditation (sāmāyika), observe great vows, although the conduct-deluding karmas remain in operation.

According to Achārya Pujyapada's Sarvārthasiddhi:

One attains the great vows when one practises sāmāyika (concentration) at a particular place and time, since one is free from minute and gross injury and so on. It is argued that it would be perfect restraint and discipline (sanyan). But it is untenable, as there is the presence of karmas or passions which arrest complete restraint. In that case these should not be called great vows. No. These are called great vows figuratively.

Jain texts list down five transgressions of the vow of sāmāyika. These are: misdirected activity of the speech, mind, and body, lack of earnestness, and absent mindedness.

=== Ascetics ===
The ascetic has to perform the sāmāyika three times a day. According to Champat Rai Jain, for accomplished ascetics, embodying desirelessness, their whole life is "a continuous sāmāyika." (Note: Champat Rai Jain: "The ascetic who has successfully passed through the preliminary stages of renunciation, as a householder, is expected to be an embodiment of desirelessness itself, so that his whole life is, as it were, a continuous sāmāyika from one end to the other.")

In performing the samayika meditation the following points are prescribed for the monk:

1. she should not perform it disrespectfully,
2. nor filled with pride of learning,
3. nor to be considered pious by her fellow-women,
4. nor in a manner to cause disturbance to any other living being,
5. she should not move the body about at the time,
6. nor force it into a crooked position, e.g. bending the fingers.
7. not contract or gather together the bodily limbs,
8. not raise herself up and down like a fish on the top of a wave;
9. she should rid her mind of all cruel thoughts;
10. she should not encircle her knees with her hands;
11. she should not become engaged in its performance imbued with fear,
12. or with disgust, or without understanding its aim,
13. or filled with conceit at her supernatural acquisitions (if any),
14. nor with pride of birth;
15. she should not take to it (samayika) sneakingly, that is as a thief, i.e., behind the back of the (preceptor),
16. nor neglect its proper time,
17. she should not allow the mind to be filled with unholy thoughts of hatred and the like for others;
18. she should not excite fear in any one's heart,
19. not talk to any one at the time,
20. nor think evil of any one,
21. nor suffer herself to frown,
22. nor entertain ungenerous sentiments in her heart,
23. nor allow her gaze to wander about in different directions,
24. nor sit down without carefully inspecting the ground, to avoid causing injury to insect life,
25. nor lose interest in the middle of the process.
26. nor should she neglect it altogether for the want of any of the necessary accessories,
27. she shouldn't allow her heart to be assailed by desire for sense-gratification,
28. nor omit to recite the whole of the recitation, nor get up in the middle (that is, before the end of the text appointed for the purpose),
29. nor blur over her words, nor hurry over some parts and linger unnecessarily over others;
30. nor mumble, like a dumb person, nor make faces or signs,
31. nor vociferate in a croaky voice, like a frog; and,
32. she should not allow her mind to play the truant at the time, that is, to run after the good things of the world.

== Sources ==
- Dundas, Paul (2002) [1992], The Jains (Second ed.), London and New York: Routledge, ISBN 978-0-415-26605-5
- Jain, Champat Rai (1917), The Householder's Dharma: English Translation of The Ratna Karanda Sravakachara, The Central Jaina Publishing House
- Jain, Champat Rai (1926), Sannyasa Dharma, Allahabad: Belveders Palace
- Jain, Champat Rai (1975). The Key Of Knowledge (Third ed.). New Delhi: Today and Tomorrow's Printers.
- Jaini, Padmanabh S. (1998) [1979], The Jain Path of Purification, Delhi: Motilal Banarsidass, ISBN 978-81-208-1578-0
- Jain, S.A. (1960), Reality (Second ed.), Jwalamalini Trust
- Jain, S.A. (1992) [1960], Reality (English Translation of Srimat Pujyapadacharya's Sarvarthasiddhi) (Second ed.), Jwalamalini Trust
- Jain, Vijay K. (2012), Acharya Amritchandra's Purushartha Siddhyupaya, Vikalp Printers, ISBN 9788190363945
- Johnson, W.J. (1995), Harmless Souls: Karmic Bondage and Religious Change in Early Jainism with Special Reference to Umāsvāti and Kundakunda, Motilal Banarsidass, ISBN 978-81-208-1309-0
- Sangave, Vilas Adinath (1980), Jain Community: A Social Survey (2nd ed.), Bombay: Popular Prakashan, ISBN 978-0-317-12346-3
- Shah, Natubhai (2004) [1998], Jainism: The World of Conquerors, vol. I, Motilal Banarsidass, ISBN 978-81-208-1938-2
