= Pratikramana =

Confession and repentance for transgressions in Jainism

Pratikramana (Sanskrit: प्रतिक्रमण, romanized: Pratikramaṇa; also spelled Pratikraman) (lit. "introspection"), is a ritual during which Jains repent (prayaschit) for their sins and non-meritorious activities committed knowingly or inadvertently during their daily life through thought, speech or action.

Pratikramana also refers to a combition of six avashyaks (essential rituals), being Samayik (state of total equanimity), Chauvisantho (honoring the 24 Tirthankars), Vandana – (offering salutations to sadhus (monks) and sadhvis (nuns)), Pratikramana (introspection and repentance), Kayotsarga (meditation of the soul) and Pratyakhyan (renunciation).

Although frequency of repenting varies, devout Jains often practice Pratikraman at least twice a day. It is one of the 28 primary attributes (mūla guņa) of both Śvētāmbara and Digambara monks.

== Etymology ==
Pratikramana is the combination of two words, Pra meaning "return" and atikramana meaning "violation". Literally, it means "returning from violations".

== Types of Pratikramana ==
There are five types of Pratikramana:

1. Devasi
2. Ray
3. Pakhi
4. Chaumasi
5. Samvatsari

=== Devasi Pratikraman ===
Devasi Pratikramana' is performed daily in the evening.

=== Rayi Pratikraman ===
Rayi Pratikraman is performed in the early morning.

=== Pakhi Pratikraman ===
Pakhi Pratikramana is done once every fifteen days. It falls on 15th and 30th dates (sud and vad) of the Hindu calendar month.

=== Chaumasi Pratikraman ===
Chaumasi Pratikramana is done once in four months on the Purnima (full moon) of the Kartik, Falgun and Aṣaṛh months of the Vira Nirvana Samvat calendrical year for the sins committed during that period.

=== Samvatsari Pratikramana ===
Samvatsari Pratikraman is done once per year on the last day of Paryushana mahaparv for the sins committed during the whole year. As per holy Jain Agamas, Samvatsari Pratikaman is practiced on the 4th/5th day (sud) of Bhadarva month of the Hindu calendar.

Samvatsari Pratikraman includes all six things a Śrāvaka (householders) must do.

== Overview ==
Jainism considers the soul, in its pure form, to have infinite perception, knowledge, and vigor, and to be non-attached. These attributes are not seen in a worldly soul because it is soiled with karmas. By following religious principles and activities, Jains believe they overcome karmas and promote liberation of the soul. There are various rituals, of which Pratikraman is the most important. During pratikraman, Jains repent for non-meritorious activities on a daily basis.

Pratikraman must be performed twice every day, or at least once every day after sunset. If that is not possible, at least on every Pakkhi (24 times in a year). If that is not possible, at least one every Chaumasi (3 times in a year). If none of the above is possible a Jain must perform at least Samvatsari Pratikraman (once a year).

== Sāmāyika ==
Pratikramana is also done while performing the sāmāyika (periodic concentration). In performing sāmāyika, the śrāvaka has to stand and follow a procedure to begin a sāmāyika. Later, 48 minutes after beginning a sāmāyika, the śrāvaka ends the sāmāyika with a procedure.

== Chauvisantho ==
Chauvisantho, also called Chaturvinshatistava, means adoration of the twenty-four Tirthankaras. While reciting it, Jains show their respect for the Tirthankaras and are reminded of how victorious these Jinas were, who overcame inner enemies like anger, ego, greed, deceit, etc. Chauvisantho encourages Jains to emulate Tirthankars and strive to be like them.

== Pratyakhyan ==
This is a formal renunciation of certain activities, which stops or reduces the inflow of karmas to a great extent. This activity helps us to learn to control our desires and prepares us for a much bigger renunciation.

== See also ==
- Forgiveness in Jainism
- Samvatsari
- Paryushan
