= Paryushana =

Most important festivals for the Jains

Paryushan Parva
- Also called: Paryushan Parva
- Observed by: Jains
- Observances: fasting, going to the Jain Temple
- Date: August or September
- 2026 date: 8 September (Tue) – 15 September (Tue)
- Duration: 8 days
- Related to: Samvatsari

Paryushana is an annual holy event in Jainism and is usually celebrated in August, September, or October in the Hindu calendar month of Bhadrapad's Shukla Paksha. Jains increase their level of spiritual intensity, often using fasting and prayer/meditation to help. The five main vows are emphasized during this time. There are no set rules, and followers are encouraged to practice according to their abilities and desires. However, the conduct of ascetics and lay-followers during the festival is largely governed by the Paryushana-Kalpa within Bhadrabāhu's Kalpa Sūtra. The event lasts for eight days and ends with the celebration of Samvatsari (forgiveness day).

== Meaning ==
The word "Paryushana" means "abiding and coming together". It is a time when the Jains take on vows of study and fasting.

== History ==
Paryushana began with an ancient Indian tradition called varṣāvāsa or cāturmāsa, which means a four-month rainy season retreat. During the heavy monsoon rains, wandering monks and nuns stopped traveling and stayed in one fixed place. This practice directly helped them follow the cardinal vow of nonviolence (ahimsa). By staying still, they avoided accidentally stepping on or harming the many tiny insects and living organisms that grow rapidly during the rainy season. Mahavira, the 24th tirthankara, turned this seasonal practice into an official rule for monastic life. These early institutional rules outlined the shared duties of both the monks and the regular householders. Over time, this rainy season retreat became an important annual opportunity for the entire community to come together and focus on spiritual growth.

During the festival, followers focus heavily on a sacred text called the Kalpa Sūtra, specifically a section named the Paryuṣaṇa-kalpa. Jain tradition states that this text was originally composed by the ancient sage Bhadrabāhu. For a long time, these sacred teachings were passed down exclusively by speech rather than written records. In the 5th century CE, a severe famine threatened the survival of the monks who memorized these teachings, causing a council at Valabhi to finally write the texts down. Centuries later, kings in Western India funded the copying and rich decorating of these sacred books. Reading the Kalpa Sūtra out loud evolved into a major community event during the festival days. Beautifully illustrated pages were shown to the public so they could view them and gain spiritual merit.

As Jainism developed its two main groups—the Śvetāmbara and the Digambara—the festival split into two distinct paths. The Śvetāmbara group celebrates the festival for a specific period of eight days. Their festival ends with a special day of intense prayer and repentance called Samvatsari. The Digambara group observes a ten-day festival called Daśa Lakṣaṇa Parva, which starts right after the Śvetāmbara festival ends. Instead of reading the life stories of the tirthankaras, the Digambaras spend each day meditating on ten different virtues of the soul from a text called the Tattvārtha Sūtra. Even with these differences, both groups focus heavily on fasting, self-control, and asking each other for forgiveness by saying the Prakrit expression micchami dukkadam ("may my improper actions be inconsequential"). Because nonviolence is so critical during this time, several state governments in India temporarily close public slaughterhouses during the festival.

== Observances ==
Jains observe Paryushana for eight days. Almost all Jains see participation in Paryushana as a duty.

=== Sermons ===
During the first three days, sermons are based on the Paryushana Stahnika Vyakhyana, explaining the duties of Paryushana and annual duties. Explanations draw on stories of exemplary figures in Jain history.

The five duties of Paryushana are not killing, affection for fellow Jains, statement of annulling faults in the past year, a three-day fast, and pilgrimage.

Starting on the fourth day, ascetics of the Śvetāmbara Murtipujaka tradition recite the Kalpa Sūtra, which includes a recitation of the section on the birth of Mahavira on the fifth day. Some Śvetāmbaras recite the Antagada Sutra, which details the life of 90 great men and women who attained moksha during the eras of the 22nd Tirthankar Neminatha and 24th Tirthankar Mahavira.

=== Fasting ===
During Paryushana, Jains usually observe a fast. The span of the fast can last from a day to 30 days or more. In Śvetāmbara tradition, śrāvakas (laypeople) fast by having only boiled water that may be consumed between sunrise and sunset only.

=== Requesting forgiveness ===
At the conclusion of the festival, śrāvakas request each other for forgiveness for all offenses committed during the last year. Forgiveness is asked for by saying "Micchami Dukkadam" to each other. This translates to: "If I have caused you offence in any way, knowingly or unknowingly, in thought word or deed, then I seek your forgiveness".

== Date ==
The date for Paryushana is Bhadra shukla panchami. For this duration, Paryushana must be initiated by panchami (the fifth day) of the shukla paksha phase of Bhadra. The last day is called Samvatsari, short for Samvatsari Pratikramana. Due to computational and other differences, there can be some minor differences among various sects. It comes at the time when the wandering monks take up temporary residence for the monsoon period or "cāturmāsa" ("four-month"). Because at this time the monks have settled in the town for a longer duration, it is time for the householders to have an annual renewal of the faith by listening to the statement of the Dharma and through meditation and vratas (self-control). Śvetāmbaras celebrate an eight-day festival that ends with Bhadrapada shukla chaturthi.

It is believed that the devas (heavenly beings) do an eight-part puja (worship) of the tirthankaras, which takes eight days. Śvetāmbara Jains celebrate this period as Paryushana.

== Public and legal impact ==
Slaughter houses are kept closed for one to eight days during the Paryushana festival in Indian states that have a large Jain population, including Rajasthan, Gujarat and Maharashtra. On 14 March 2008, the Supreme Court held that the ban on slaughterhouses in Ahmedabad during Paryushan festival was legal. The court noted:

In a multi-cultural country like ours with such diversity, one should not be over sensitive and over touchy about a short restriction when it is being done out of respect for the sentiments of a particular section of society. It has been stated above that the great Emperor Akbar himself used to remain a vegetarian for a few days every week out of respect for the vegetarian section of the Indian society and out of respect for his Hindu wife. We too should have similar respect for the sentiments for others, even if they are a minority sect. (para 74)

== See also ==
- Mahavir Janma Kalyanak
- Ratnatraya
- God in Jainism
- Jain cosmology
- Sallekhana
- Jain festival
