= Bhatkal and Sen =

Publishing partnership between Mandira Sen and Popular Prakashan

Bhatkal & Sen is a publishing partnership between Mandira Sen and Popular Prakashan. The company is based in Kolkata and publishes the imprints Stree and Samya. It is noted for publishing authors such as Kancha Ilaiah, Om Prakash Valmiki, Uma Chakravarti, Gail Omvedt, Manikuntala Sen, Ashok Mitra, V. Geetha, and Bani Basu, and has prominent scholars such as Susie Tharu and Maithreyi Krishnaraj as editors. It publishes academic works in the social sciences, memoirs and classic fiction in translation in English and Bengali.

Popular Prakashan is a Bombay-based publishing firm established in 1920 by Ganesh R. Bhatkal, a former employee of OUP Bombay.

== Beginnings of Stree ==
Mandira Sen worked as a publisher's editor for Houghton Mifflin among others in the US, until she returned to India in 1978. She worked for a year for Orient Longman, then set up Mandira, which published bilingual children's books; with English text on the verso pages and the same text in an Indian language on the recto. Some books were also published in Hindi, Bengali, Punjabi, Urdu and Gujarati. The books were intended for export to help the children of non-resident Indians to learn their mother-tongues. Distribution was a major problem, and in 1986 Mandira Sen met Ramdas Bhatkal of Popular Prakashan at an international book fair. Bhatkal and Sen was set up in 1990, creating a new imprint "Stree" which publishes books dealing with women's issues and social sciences.

== The early years ==
During her time in the US, Mandira Sen had come into contact with many women's rights activists and she wished to use this experience to highlight the work that was being done concerning women's issues in India; and to help educate people about the movement and its contributions to civil society. Stree's early titles fell into the following categories:

1. Scholarly translations of important texts in Indian languages by or about women that deserved to reach a wider audience.
2. Works of scholarship in the social sciences with an Indian context or sources, or by Indian scholars, with special reference to women, and
3. Popular works dealing with concepts and ideas of the women's movement with the objective of introducing them to Indian audiences.

Stree's first title was a translation of a Gujarati novel by S. J. Joshi, Anandi Gopal, a fictional retelling of the life of the first Indian woman to qualify as a doctor. Many titles followed, including Women as Subjects: South Asian Histories edited by Nita Kumar (ISBN 81-85604-03-7), The Struggle Against Violence edited by Chhaya Datar (ISBN 978-81-85604-01-5), and other works.

== The Bengali List, and Samya ==
In 1996, the singer-songwriter Moushumi Bhowmik came to Stree as an editor. She began and developed Stree's Bengali lists, which included works such as Sambuddha Chakrabarti's Andare Antare (Inside, Within), on the lives of Bengali bhadralok women in the nineteenth century. There was also Pinjore Boshiya (Inside the Cage), a collection of essays by Kalyani Dutta, edited by the School of Women's Studies at Jadavpur University. The third title was a translation of Kamla Bhasin's What is Patriarchy? into Bengali.

The year 1996 also saw the inception of the Samya imprint. The occasion for this was the publication of Kancha Ilaiah's Why I Am Not a Hindu: A Sudra Critique of Hindutva Philosophy, Culture and Political Economy. Ilaiah had been turned away by a number of publishers who felt his work was too controversial; Sen felt his critique of the caste system fitted in with Stree's parallel critique of patriarchy and gender, and began the Samya imprint (meaning 'equality' or 'fairness') in 1996 with his book. Since then Samya has published Om Prakash Valmiki's Joothan, an account of a Dalit's growing up under caste oppression, and Tirumaalvalavan's Talisman: Extreme Emotions of Dalit Awakening, translated by Meena Kandasamy.

== Literary translations ==
Stree also publishes an extensive list of works in translation by women writers past and present. These include Sulekha Sanyal's Nabankur (The Seedling's Tale) and Bani Basu's The Birth of the Maitreya (Maitreyo Jatak). Marathi works translated into English include Kamal Desai's Dark Sun and The Woman Who Wore a Hat, Saroj Pathak's Whom Can I Tell? How Can I Explain? and Vibhavari Shirurkar's Kharemaster. Many of these books form part of the Gender Culture Politics series, edited by Susie Tharu.

Stree has helped to bring to a wider audience many forgotten memoirs by early women writers such as Lalithambika Antherjanam's Cast Me Out If You Will which documents Namboodiri oppression of Nair women in nineteenth century Kerala. In this category falls Manikuntala Sen's In Search of Freedom: An Unfinished Journey, a translation of her Shediner Kotha which traces the early years of the Communist movement in India.

Interrogating My Chandal Life: An Autobiography of a Dalit by Manoranjan Byapari, translated from Bengali by Sipra Mukherjee, co-published by the India arm of SAGE Publishing and the Samya imprint of Bhatkal & Sen, won The Hindu Literary Prize in the category Best Nonfiction in the year 2018.

== Theorizing Feminism series ==
Stree also publishes a series "Theorizing Feminism" which includes Patriarchy (book) by V. Geetha.

== See also ==
- List of Urdu language book publishing companies
