= Patriarchy (disambiguation) =

Patriarchy is the structuring of a society under male leaders.

Patriarchy may also refer to:

- Patriarchy, or patriarchate, the office or jurisdiction of an Eastern Orthodox patriarch
- Patriarchy, a 1980s Iranian TV series, known for its score by Bahram Dehghanyar
- "Patriarchy", the 2006 debut episode of the TV series Brothers & Sisters; see List of Brothers & Sisters episodes
- Patriarchy (book), a 2007 book by V Geetha
- Patriarchy: Notes of an Expert Witness, a 1994 book by Phyllis Chesler
- The Patriarchy (professional wrestling), professional wrestling stable

== See also ==
- Patriarch
- Patriarch (disambiguation)
- Patriarchal system (Western Zhou)
