= Sulekha (name) =

Sulekha is an Indian and Arabic feminine given name. Notable people with the name include:

- Sulekha Hussain (1930–2014), Urdu novelist
- Sulekha Kumbhare (born 1962), Indian politician
- Sulekha Sanyal (1928–1962), Bengali writer
- Sulekha Talwalkar (born 1971), Marathi film actress
