= November 20 =

November 20 this year in various calendars
- Friday, 20 November 2026
Akan	Nwonafie
Armenian	3 Kʿaloch 1476
Aztec	Tlacaxipehualiztli 9, 3 Ehēcatl
Babylonian	9 Arakhsamna, 2337 SE
Balinese pawukon	Luang, Pepet, Beteng, Menala, Umanis, Aryang, Sukra of Ukir, Yama, Tulus, Pati
Bengali	5 Ogrohayon, BS 1433
Chinese	Yang Earth Dog・Ox Mansion; Fire Horse Year, Month 10, Day 12 (Lidong, 2 days until Xiaoxue)
Common Era	20 November 2026 CE
Coptic	11 Hathor, AM 1743
Egyptian	8 Pharmuthi, 2775 NE
Ethiopian	11 H̱edār, 2019 Amätä Məhrät
French Republican	Décade III, Nonidi de Brumaire de l'Année 235 de la République
Gregorian	20 November, AD 2026
Hebrew	10 Kislev, AM 5787
Hindu	Uttarabhādrapada・Harṣaṇa; Solar: 4 Mārgaśīrṣa, 1948 SE; Lunisolar: Ekādaśī, Śukla pakṣa of Kārtika, 2083 VE; Rāudra・5127 KY・1,872,899
Icelandic	Föstudagur, 28 Gormánuður 2026
Islamic	9 Jumada al-thani, AH 1448 (using tabular method)
ISO week date	2026-W47-5
Japanese	12 Kannazuki, Reiwa 8 (Rittō, 2 days until Shōsetsu)
Julian	7 November, AD 2026 (AM 7535)
Julian day	2461365
Korean	12 Dwaejidal, 4359 DE
Maya	13.0.14.2.2; 15 Ceh, 3 Ik
Roman	ante diem VII Idus Novembres, MMDCCLXXIX AUC
Solar Hijri	29 Aban, SH 1405
Tibetan	11 smin drug, me pho rta 2153 or 1772 or 1000

<<	November					>>
Su	Mo	Tu	We	Th	Fr	Sa
1	2	3	4	5	6	7
8	9	10	11	12	13	14
15	16	17	18	19	20	21
22	23	24	25	26	27	28
29	30
2026

November 20 in recent years
2026 (Friday)
2025 (Thursday)
2024 (Wednesday)
2023 (Monday)
2022 (Sunday)
2021 (Saturday)
2020 (Friday)
2019 (Wednesday)
2018 (Tuesday)
2017 (Monday)

November 20 is the 324th day of the year (325th in leap years) in the Gregorian calendar; 41 days remain until the end of the year.

== Events ==
=== Pre-1600 ===
- 284 – Diocletian is chosen as Roman emperor.
- 762 – During the An Shi Rebellion, the Tang dynasty, with the help of Huihe tribe, recaptures Luoyang from the rebels.
- 1194 – Palermo is conquered by Henry VI, Holy Roman Emperor.
- 1272 – Edward I becomes king of England following the death of his father Henry III of England.
- 1407 – John the Fearless, Duke of Burgundy, and Louis of Valois, Duke of Orléans, agree to a truce, but Burgundy would kill Orléans three days later.
- 1441 – The Peace of Cremona ends the war between the Republic of Venice and the Duchy of Milan, after the victorious Venetian enterprise of military engineering of the Galeas per montes.

=== 1601–1900 ===
- 1695 – Zumbi, the last of the leaders of Quilombo dos Palmares in early Brazil, is executed by the forces of Portuguese bandeirante Domingos Jorge Velho.
- 1710 – Begin of the Russo-Turkish War of 1710–1713, after tensions between the two states escalate as the Ottomans provide shelter to King Charles XII of Sweden in their fortress of Bender.
- 1739 – Start of the Battle of Porto Bello between British and Spanish forces during the War of Jenkins' Ear.
- 1759 – The British fleet under Edward Hawke defeats a French fleet under Hubert de Brienne in the battle of Quiberon Bay, thus diminishing the chances for a French invasion of Britain.
- 1776 – American Revolutionary War: British forces land at the Palisades and then attack Fort Lee. The Continental Army starts to retreat across New Jersey.
- 1789 – New Jersey becomes the first U.S. state to ratify the Bill of Rights.
- 1805 – Beethoven's only opera, Fidelio, premieres in Vienna.
- 1815 – The Second Treaty of Paris is signed, returning the French frontiers to their 1790 extent, imposing large indemnities, and prolonging the occupation by troops of Great Britain, Austria, Prussia, and Russia for several more years.
- 1820 – An 80-ton sperm whale attacks and sinks the Essex (a whaling ship from Nantucket, Massachusetts) 3,200 kilometres (2,000 mi) from the western coast of South America. (Herman Melville's 1851 novel Moby-Dick was in part inspired by this incident.)
- 1845 – Anglo-French blockade of the Río de la Plata: Battle of Vuelta de Obligado.
- 1861 – American Civil War: A secession ordinance is filed by Kentucky's Confederate government.
- 1873 – Garnier Expedition: French forces under Lieutenant Francis Garnier captured Hanoi from the Vietnamese.
- 1900 – The French actress Sarah Bernhardt receives the press at the Savoy Hotel in New York at the outset of her first visit since 1896. She talked about her impending tour with a troupe of more than 50 performers and her plans to play the title role in Hamlet.

=== 1901–present ===
- 1910 – Mexican Revolution: Francisco I. Madero issues the Plan de San Luis Potosí, denouncing Mexican President Porfirio Díaz, calling for a revolution to overthrow the government of Mexico, effectively starting the Mexican Revolution.
- 1917 – World War I: Battle of Cambrai begins: British forces make early progress in an attack on German positions but are later pushed back.
- 1936 – José Antonio Primo de Rivera, founder of the Falange, is killed by a republican execution squad.
- 1940 – World War II: Hungary becomes a signatory of the Tripartite Pact, officially joining the Axis powers.
- 1943 – World War II: Battle of Tarawa (Operation Galvanic) begins: United States Marines land on Tarawa Atoll in the Gilbert Islands and suffer heavy fire from Japanese shore guns and machine guns.
- 1945 – Nuremberg trials: Trials against 24 Nazi war criminals start at the Palace of Justice at Nuremberg.
- 1946 – Indonesian National Revolution: 96 Indonesian including I Gusti Ngurah Rai were killed during the Battle of Margarana with Dutch forces.
- 1947 – The Princess Elizabeth (the future Queen) marries Lieutenant Philip Mountbatten, who becomes the Duke of Edinburgh, at Westminster Abbey in London.
- 1959 – The Declaration of the Rights of the Child is adopted by the United Nations.
- 1962 – Cuban Missile Crisis ends: In response to the Soviet Union agreeing to remove its missiles from Cuba, U.S. President John F. Kennedy ends the quarantine of the Caribbean nation.
- 1968 – A total of 78 miners are killed in an explosion at the Consolidated Coal Company's No. 9 mine in Farmington, West Virginia in the Farmington Mine disaster.
- 1969 – Vietnam War: The Plain Dealer (Cleveland, Ohio) publishes explicit photographs of dead villagers from the My Lai Massacre in Vietnam.
- 1969 – Occupation of Alcatraz: Native American activists seize control of Alcatraz Island until being ousted by the U.S. Government on June 11, 1971.
- 1974 – The United States Department of Justice files its final anti-trust suit against AT&T Corporation. This suit later leads to the breakup of AT&T and its Bell System.
- 1974 – The first fatal crash of a Boeing 747 occurs when Lufthansa Flight 540 crashes while attempting to takeoff from Jomo Kenyatta International Airport in Nairobi, Kenya, killing 59 out of the 157 people on board.
- 1977 – Egyptian President Anwar Sadat becomes the first Arab leader to officially visit Israel, when he meets Israeli prime minister Menachem Begin and speaks before the Knesset in Jerusalem, seeking a permanent peace settlement.
- 1979 – Grand Mosque seizure: About 200 Sunni Muslims revolt in Saudi Arabia at the site of the Kaaba in Mecca during the pilgrimage and take about 6,000 hostages. The Saudi government receives help from French special forces to put down the uprising.
- 1980 – Lake Peigneur in Louisiana drains into an underlying salt deposit. A misplaced Texaco oil probe had been drilled into the Diamond Crystal Salt Mine, causing water to flow down into the mine, eroding the edges of the hole.
- 1985 – Microsoft Windows 1.0, the first graphical personal computer operating environment developed by Microsoft, is released.
- 1989 – Velvet Revolution: The number of protesters assembled in Prague, Czechoslovakia, swells from 200,000 the day before to an estimated half-million.
- 1990 – Andrei Chikatilo, one of the Soviet Union's most prolific serial killers, is arrested; he eventually confesses to 56 killings.
- 1991 – An Azerbaijani MI-8 helicopter carrying 19 peacekeeping mission team with officials and journalists from Russia, Kazakhstan and Azerbaijan is shot down by Armenian military forces in Khojavend District of Azerbaijan.
- 1992 – In England, a fire breaks out in Windsor Castle, badly damaging the castle and causing over £50 million worth of damage.
- 1993 – Savings and loan crisis: The United States Senate Ethics Committee issues a stern censure of California senator Alan Cranston for his "dealings" with savings-and-loan executive Charles Keating.
- 1993 – North Macedonia's deadliest aviation disaster occurs when Avioimpex Flight 110, a Yakovlev Yak-42, crashes near Ohrid Airport, killing all 116 people on board.
- 1994 – The Angolan government and UNITA rebels sign the Lusaka Protocol in Zambia, ending 19 years of civil war. (Localized fighting resumes the next year.)
- 1996 – A fire breaks out in an office building in Hong Kong, killing 41 people and injuring 81.
- 1998 – A court in Taliban-controlled Afghanistan declares accused terrorist Osama bin Laden "a man without a sin" in regard to the 1998 U.S. embassy bombings in Kenya and Tanzania.
- 1998 – The first space station module component, Zarya, for the International Space Station is launched from the Baikonur Cosmodrome in Kazakhstan.
- 2003 – After the November 15 bombings, a second day of the 2003 Istanbul bombings occurs in Istanbul, Turkey, destroying the Turkish head office of HSBC Bank AS and the British consulate.
- 2015 – Following a hostage siege, at least 19 people are killed in Bamako, Mali.
- 2016 – Jimmie Johnson wins his seventh NASCAR Cup Series championship to tie Richard Petty and Dale Earnhardt for the most all-time.
- 2022 – The 2022 FIFA World Cup begins in Qatar. This is the first time the tournament was held in the Middle East.

== Births ==
=== Pre-1600 ===
- 270 – Maximinus II, Roman emperor (died 313)
- 939 – Emperor Taizong of Song (died 997)
- 1545 – Ernst Ludwig, Duke of Pomerania (died 1592)

=== 1601–1900 ===
- 1602 – Otto von Guericke, German physicist and politician (died 1686)
- 1603 – Fasilides, Ethiopian emperor (died 1667)
- 1620 – Avvakum, Russian priest and saint (died 1682)
- 1625 – Paulus Potter, Dutch painter (died 1654)
- 1629 – Ernest Augustus, Duke of Brunswick-Luneburg (died 1698)
- 1660 – Daniel Ernst Jablonski, Czech-German theologian and reformer (died 1741)
- 1688 – Gyeongjong of Joseon, 20th king of the Joseon Dynasty (died 1724)
- 1715 – Pierre Charles Le Monnier, French astronomer (died 1799)
- 1717 – George (Konissky), Orthodox archbishop, preacher, philosopher and theologian (died 1795)
- 1726 – Oliver Wolcott, American politician (died 1797)
- 1733 – Philip Schuyler, American general and senator (died 1804)
- 1737 – José Antonio de Alzate y Ramírez, Spanish-Mexican scientist and cartographer (died 1799)
- 1739 – Jean-François de La Harpe, French writer and literary critic (died 1803)
- 1748 – Jean-François de Bourgoing, French diplomat, writer and translator (died 1811)
- 1750 – Tipu Sultan, Indian ruler (died 1799)
- 1752 – Thomas Chatterton, English poet (died 1770)
- 1753 – Louis-Alexandre Berthier, 1st Prince of Wagram (died 1815)
- 1755 – Stanisław Kostka Potocki, Polish noble, politician and writer (died 1821)
- 1761 – Pope Pius VIII (died 1830)
- 1776 – Ignaz Schuppanzigh, Austrian violinist (died 1830)
- 1781 – Karl Friedrich Eichhorn, German captain and jurist (died 1854)
- 1781 – Bartolomeo Pinelli, Italian illustrator and engraver (died 1835)
- 1782 – Georgius Jacobus Johannes van Os, Dutch painter (died 1861)
- 1783 – Georgios Sinas, Greek entrepreneur and banker (died 1856)
- 1784 – Marianne von Willemer, Austrian actress and dancer (died 1860)
- 1787 – Johann Nicolaus von Dreyse, German firearms inventor and manufacturer (died 1867)
- 1788 – Félix Varela, Cuban-born Roman Catholic priest (died 1853)
- 1794 – Eduard Rüppell, German naturalist and explorer (died 1884)
- 1801 – Mungo Ponton, Scottish inventor (died 1880)
- 1808 – Albert Kazimirski de Biberstein, French orientalist (died 1887)
- 1813 – Franz Miklosich, Slovenian linguist and philologist (died 1891)
- 1830 – Mikhail Dragomirov, Russian general (1905)
- 1834 – Franjo Kuhač, Croatian conductor and composer (died 1911)
- 1838 – William Painter, American mechanical engineer, inventor of the crown cork bottle cap and opener (died 1906)
- 1841 – Victor D'Hondt, Belgian mathematician, lawyer, and jurist (died 1901)
- 1841 – François Denys Légitime, Haitian general (died 1935)
- 1841 – Wilfrid Laurier, Canadian lawyer and politician, 7th Prime Minister of Canada (died 1919)
- 1850 – Joseph Samuel Bloch, Austrian rabbi and deputy (died 1923)
- 1850 – Charlotte Garrigue, wife of Tomáš Garrigue Masaryk (died 1923)
- 1851 – Mikhail Albov, Russian writer (died 1911)
- 1851 – John Merle Coulter, American botanist (died 1928)
- 1851 – Margherita of Savoy, Italian Queen consort (died 1926)
- 1853 – Oskar Potiorek, Austro-Hungarian Army officer (died 1933)
- 1855 – Josiah Royce, American philosopher (died 1916)
- 1857 – Helena Westermarck, Finnish artist and writer (died 1938)
- 1858 – Selma Lagerlöf, Swedish author and educator, Nobel Prize laureate (died 1940)
- 1860 – José Figueroa Alcorta, President of Argentina, (died 1931)
- 1861 – Camillo Laurenti, Italian Cardinal of the Roman Catholic Church (died 1938)
- 1862 – Georges Palante, French philosopher and sociologist (died 1925)
- 1862 – Edvard Westermarck, Finnish philosopher and sociologist (died 1939)
- 1864 – Percy Cox, British Indian Army officer (died 1937)
- 1866 – Kenesaw Mountain Landis, American lawyer and judge (died 1944)
- 1866 – Maria Letizia Bonaparte, daughter of Prince Napoléon Bonaparte (died 1926)
- 1867 – Patrick Joseph Hayes, American Cardinal of the Roman Catholic Church (died 1938)
- 1867 – Gustav Giemsa, German chemist and bacteriologist (died 1948)
- 1869 – Zinaida Gippius, Russian writer and editor (died 1945)
- 1869 – Josaphata Hordashevska, Ukrainian Greek-Catholic nun (died 1919)
- 1871 – William Heard Kilpatrick, American pedagogue (died 1965)
- 1871 – Augusto Weberbauer, German naturalist (died 1948)
- 1873 – Ramón Castillo, Argentine politician (died 1944)
- 1873 – William Coblentz, American physicist (died 1962)
- 1873 – Georges Caussade, French composer (died 1936)
- 1873 – Daniel Gregory Mason, American composer and music critic (died 1953)
- 1874 – James Michael Curley, American lawyer, politician, 53rd Governor of Massachusetts, and criminal (died 1958)
- 1875 – Friedrich Werner von der Schulenburg, German diplomat (died 1944)
- 1876 – Rudolf Koch, German designer (died 1934)
- 1877 – Herbert Pitman, English sailor (died 1961)
- 1880 – Walter Brack, German swimmer (died 1919)
- 1881 – Irakli Tsereteli, Georgian politician (died 1959)
- 1882 – Ernestas Galvanauskas, Lithuanian engineer and politician (died 1967)
- 1883 – Edwin August, American actor and director (died 1964)
- 1883 – Tony Gaudio, Italian American cinematographer (died 1951)
- 1884 – Norman Thomas, American minister and politician (died 1968)
- 1885 – George Holley, English footballer (died 1942)
- 1885 – Kaarlo Vasama, Finnish gymnast (died 1926)
- 1886 – Robert Hunter, American golfer (died 1971)
- 1886 – Karl von Frisch, Austrian-German ethologist and zoologist, Nobel Prize laureate (died 1982)
- 1886 – Alexandre Stavisky, French financier and embezzler (died 1934)
- 1887 – Jean Ducret, French footballer (died 1975)
- 1888 – Dennis Fenton, American sports shooter (died 1954)
- 1889 – Edwin Hubble, American astronomer and cosmologist (died 1953)
- 1890 – Robert Armstrong, American actor (died 1973)
- 1890 – Harald Madsen, Danish actor (died 1949)
- 1890 – Lauri Tanner, Finnish gymnast (died 1950)
- 1891 – Reginald Denny, English actor (died 1967)
- 1892 – James Collip, Canadian biochemist and academic, co-discovered insulin (died 1965)
- 1893 – André Bloch, French mathematician (died 1948)
- 1893 – Grace Darmond, Canadian-American actress (died 1963)
- 1894 – Johann Nikuradse, Georgian-born German engineer and physicist (died 1979)
- 1895 – Pierre Cot, French politician (died 1977)
- 1896 – Chiyono Hasegawa, Japanese supercentenarian (died 2011)
- 1896 – Carl Mayer, Austrian-Jewish screenplay writer (died 1944)
- 1897 – Germaine Krull, German photographer and political activist (died 1985)
- 1898 – Richmond Landon, American high jumper (died 1971)
- 1898 – Adrian Piotrovsky, Russian dramaturge (died 1937)
- 1899 – Alicja Kotowska, Polish nun (died 1939)
- 1900 – Florieda Batson, American Olympic hurdler (died 1996)
- 1900 – Helen Bradley, English painter (died 1979)
- 1900 – Chester Gould, American cartoonist and author, created Dick Tracy (died 1985)

=== 1901–present ===
- 1901 – José Leandro Andrade, Uruguayan footballer (died 1957)
- 1902 – Gianpiero Combi, Italian footballer (died 1956)
- 1902 – Erik Eriksen, Danish politician (died 1972)
- 1902 – Heini Meng, Swiss ice hockey player (died 1982)
- 1902 – Jean Painlevé, French photographer and filmmaker (died 1989)
- 1902 – Philipp Schmitt, German officer of the Schutzstaffel (died 1950)
- 1903 – Alexandra Danilova, Russian-American ballerina and choreographer (died 1997)
- 1903 – Ishtiaq Hussain Qureshi, Pakistani historian and educator (died 1981)
- 1904 – Arnold Gartmann, Swiss bobsledder (died 1980)
- 1905 – Minoo Masani, Indian lawyer and politician (died 1998)
- 1906 – Vera Tanner, English swimmer (died 1971)
- 1907 – Fran Allison, American entertainer (died 1989)
- 1907 – Mihai Beniuc, Romanian writer (died 1988)
- 1907 – Henri-Georges Clouzot, French film director, screenwriter and producer (died 1977)
- 1907 – Anni Rehborn, German swimmer (died 1987)
- 1908 – Louis, Prince of Hesse and by Rhine, the youngest son of Ernest Louis, Grand Duke of Hesse (died 1968)
- 1908 – Alistair Cooke, British-American journalist and author (died 2004)
- 1908 – Jenő Vincze, Hungarian footballer (died 1988)
- 1909 – John Berger, Swiss cross-country skier (died 2002)
- 1909 – Vicente Feola, Brazilian football manager and coach (died 1975)
- 1909 – Piero Gherardi, Italian costume and set designer (died 1971)
- 1909 – Samand Siabandov, Soviet Red Army writer (died 1989)
- 1910 – Willem Jacob van Stockum, Dutch mathematician, pilot, and academic (died 1944)
- 1910 – Pauli Murray, American civil rights activist, women's rights activist, lawyer, Episcopal priest, and author (died 1985)
- 1911 – Eduard Kainberger, Austrian footballer (died 1974)
- 1911 – David Seymour, Polish photographer (died 1956)
- 1911 – Jean Shiley, American high jumper (died 1998)
- 1911 – Rupert Weinstabl, Austrian sprint canoeist (died 1953)
- 1911 – Paul Zielinski, German footballer (died 1966)
- 1912 – Enrique Garcia, Argentine footballer (died 1969)
- 1912 – Otto von Habsburg, the last Crown Prince of Austria-Hungary (died 2011)
- 1913 – Franz Berghammer, Austrian field handballer (died 1944)
- 1913 – Charles Berlitz, American linguist (died 2003)
- 1913 – Charles Bettelheim, French Marxian economist and historian (died 2006)
- 1913 – Judy Canova, American actress and comedian (died 1983)
- 1913 – Kostas Choumis, Greek footballer (died 1981)
- 1913 – Russell Rouse, American screenwriter, director and producer (died 1987)
- 1913 – Libertas Schulze-Boysen, German opponent of the Nazis (died 1942)
- 1913 – Yakov Zak, Soviet pianist (died 1976)
- 1914 – Emilio Pucci, Italian fashion designer and politician (died 1992)
- 1914 – Kurt Lundqvist, Swedish high jumper (died 1976)
- 1915 – Kon Ichikawa, Japanese director, producer, and screenwriter (died 2008)
- 1915 – Hu Yaobang, Chinese politician (died 1989)
- 1916 – Charles E. Osgood, American psychologist (died 1991)
- 1916 – Michael J. Ingelido, American general (died 2015)
- 1916 – Evelyn Keyes, American actress (died 2008)
- 1916 – Donald T. Campbell, American social scientist (died 1996)
- 1917 – Robert Byrd, American lawyer and politician (died 2010)
- 1917 – Leonard Jimmie Savage, American mathematician (died 1971)
- 1917 – Erich Leo Lehmann, American statistician (died 2009)
- 1917 – Bobby Locke, South African golfer (died 1987)
- 1918 – Corita Kent, American nun, illustrator, and educator (died 1986)
- 1918 – Heinrich Ratjen, German high jumper (died 2008)
- 1919 – Alan Brown, English race car driver (died 2004)
- 1919 – Phyllis Thaxter, American actress (died 2012)
- 1920 – Douglas Dick, American actor and psychologist (died 2015)
- 1921 – Jim Garrison, American lawyer and judge (died 1992)
- 1923 – Gunnar Åkerlund, Swedish sprint canoer (died 2006)
- 1923 – Danny Dayton, American actor and director (died 1999)
- 1923 – Tonino Delli Colli, Italian cinematographer (died 2005)
- 1923 – Nadine Gordimer, South African novelist, short story writer, and activist, Nobel Prize laureate (died 2014)
- 1924 – Bill Borthwick, Australian politician (died 2001)
- 1924 – Timothy Evans, Welshman wrongfully convicted of murder (died 1950)
- 1924 – Karen Harup, Danish swimmer (died 2009)
- 1924 – Benoit Mandelbrot, Polish-American mathematician and economist (died 2010)
- 1924 – Michael Riffaterre, French literary critic and theorist (died 2006)
- 1924 – Henk Vredeling, Dutch agronomist and politician, Dutch Minister of Defence (died 2007)
- 1925 – June Christy, American singer (died 1990)
- 1925 – Robert F. Kennedy, US Navy officer, lawyer, and politician, 64th United States Attorney General (died 1968)
- 1925 – Maya Plisetskaya, Russian-Lithuanian ballerina, choreographer, actress, and director (died 2015)
- 1926 – John Gardner, English soldier and author (died 2007)
- 1926 – Tôn Thất Đính, Vietnamese general (died 2013)
- 1926 – Édouard Leclerc, French businessman and entrepreneur (died 2012)
- 1926 – Miroslav Tichý, Czech photographer (died 2011)
- 1927 – Vakhtang Balavadze, Georgian wrestler (died 2018)
- 1927 – Ed Freeman, American soldier and pilot, Medal of Honor recipient (died 2008)
- 1927 – Estelle Parsons, American actress and director
- 1927 – Wolfgang Schreyer, German writer (died 2017)
- 1927 – Mikhail Ulyanov, Soviet and Russian actor (died 2007)
- 1928 – Aleksey Batalov, Russian actor, director, and screenwriter (died 2017)
- 1928 – Franklin Cover, American actor (died 2006)
- 1928 – Pedro Ferrándiz, Spanish basketball coach (died 2022)
- 1928 – John Disley, Welsh athlete (died 2016)
- 1928 – Pete Rademacher, American boxer (died 2020)
- 1928 – Genrikh Sapgir, Russian writer (died 1999)
- 1929 – Jerry Hardin, American actor
- 1929 – Raymond Lefèvre, French composer (died 2008)
- 1929 – Gabriel Ochoa Uribe, Colombian footballer (died 2020)
- 1929 – Ron Willey, Australian rugby league player and coach (died 2004)
- 1930 – Christine Arnothy, French writer (died 2015)
- 1930 – Aarón Hernán, Mexican actor (died 2020)
- 1930 – Bernard Horsfall, English-Scottish actor (died 2013)
- 1930 – Choe Yong-rim, North Korean Premier
- 1931 – Wayne Moore, American swimmer (died 2015)
- 1932 – Richard Dawson, English-American actor and game show host (died 2012)
- 1932 – Yorozuya Kinnosuke, Japanese kabuki actor (died 1997)
- 1932 – Sándor Mátrai, Hungarian footballer (died 2002)
- 1932 – Paulo Valentim, Brazilian footballer (died 1984)
- 1932 – Colville Young, Governor-General of Belize
- 1934 – Paco Ibáñez, Spanish singer and musician
- 1934 – Enrique Macaya Márquez, Argentine sports journalist
- 1934 – Lev Polugaevsky, Soviet Chess Grandmaster (died 1995)
- 1935 – Leo Falcam, Micronesian politician and 5th President of Micronesia (died 2018)
- 1935 – Imre Makovecz, Hungarian architect (died 2011)
- 1936 – Hans van Abeelen, Dutch geneticist (died 1998)
- 1936 – Don DeLillo, American novelist, essayist, and playwright
- 1936 – Luciano Fabro, Italian sculptor and artist (died 2007)
- 1936 – Charles R. Larson, American admiral (died 2014)
- 1937 – René Kollo, German tenor
- 1937 – Ruth Laredo, American pianist and educator (died 2005)
- 1937 – Eero Mäntyranta, Finnish skier (died 2013)
- 1937 – Bruno Mealli, Italian cyclist (died 2023)
- 1937 – Viktoriya Tokareva, Russian author and screenwriter
- 1938 – Colin Fox, Canadian actor (died 2025)
- 1939 – Jerry Colangelo, American businessman
- 1939 – Copi, Argentine writer and artist (died 1987)
- 1939 – Dick Smothers, American actor and comedian
- 1939 – Jan Szczepański, Polish boxer (died 2017)
- 1940 – Wendy Doniger, American indologist
- 1940 – Helma Sanders-Brahms, German director, producer, and screenwriter (died 2014)
- 1940 – Ediz Hun, Turkish actor and politician
- 1940 – Arieh Warshel, Israeli-American biochemist and biophysicist
- 1941 – Oliver Sipple, U.S. Marine and Vietnam War veteran (died 1989)
- 1941 – Dr. John, American singer and songwriter (died 2019)
- 1942 – Joe Biden, American politician, 46th President of the United States
- 1942 – Bob Einstein, American actor, producer, and screenwriter (died 2019)
- 1942 – Norman Greenbaum, American singer-songwriter and guitarist
- 1942 – Meredith Monk, American composer and choreographer
- 1942 – Paulos Faraj Rahho, Chaldean Catholic Archeparch of Mosul (died 2008)
- 1943 – David Douglas-Home, British businessman and politician (died 2022)
- 1943 – Veronica Hamel, American actress and model
- 1943 – Ivan Hrdlička, Slovak footballer
- 1943 – Suze Rotolo, American artist (died 2011)
- 1944 – Louie Dampier, American basketball player and coach
- 1944 – Wayne Maki, Canadian ice hockey player (died 1974)
- 1944 – Anthea Stewart, Zimbabwean field hockey player
- 1945 – Deborah Eisenberg, American writer, actress and teacher
- 1946 – Duane Allman, American singer-songwriter and guitarist (died 1971)
- 1946 – Algimantas Butnorius, Lithuanian chess Grandmaster (died 2017)
- 1946 – Patriarch Kirill of Moscow
- 1946 – Samuel E. Wright, American actor, voice actor and singer (died 2021)
- 1947 – Nurlan Balgimbayev, Prime Minister of Kazakhstan (died 2015)
- 1947 – Eli Ben Rimoz, Israeli footballer
- 1947 – Joe Walsh, American singer-songwriter, guitarist, producer, and actor
- 1948 – John R. Bolton, American lawyer and diplomat, 25th United States Ambassador to the United Nations
- 1948 – Park Chul-soo, South Korean director, producer, and screenwriter (died 2013)
- 1948 – Barbara Hendricks, American-Swedish soprano and actress
- 1948 – Richard Masur, American actor and director
- 1948 – Gunnar Nilsson, Swedish race car driver (died 1978)
- 1948 – Kenjiro Shinozuka, Japanese race car driver (died 2024)
- 1949 – Jeff Dowd, American film producer and activist
- 1949 – Thelma Drake, American politician
- 1949 – Ulf Lundell, Swedish writer and composer
- 1949 – Juha Mieto, Finnish cross-country skier
- 1949 – Nené, Portuguese footballer
- 1950 – Jacqueline Gourault, French politician
- 1950 – Gary Green, British musician
- 1951 – Rodger Bumpass, American actor and singer
- 1951 – León Gieco, Argentine folk rock singer and interpreter
- 1951 – Aleksey Spiridonov, Soviet hammer thrower (died 1998)
- 1951 – David Walters, American businessman and politician, 24th Governor of Oklahoma
- 1952 – John Van Boxmeer, Canadian ice hockey player and coach
- 1953 – Fábio Jr., Brazilian singer-songwriter and actor
- 1953 – Greg Gibson, American wrestler
- 1953 – Halid Bešlić, Bosnian musician and singer (died 2025)
- 1953 – Nirmal Selvamony, Indian Tamil academician and ecocritic
- 1954 – Richard Brooker, English actor and stuntman (died 2013)
- 1954 – Antonina Koshel, Soviet artistic gymnast
- 1954 – Frank Marino, Canadian guitarist and singer-songwriter
- 1954 – Bin Shimada, Japanese voice actor
- 1955 – Angela Finocchiaro, Italian actress
- 1955 – Toshio Matsuura, Japanese footballer
- 1955 – Ray Ozzie, American software industry entrepreneur
- 1956 – Bo Derek, American actress and producer
- 1957 – Stefan Bellof, German race car driver (died 1985)
- 1957 – John Eriksen, Danish footballer (died 2002)
- 1957 – Jean-Marc Furlan, French football manager
- 1957 – Goodluck Jonathan, President of Nigeria
- 1958 – Rickson Gracie, Brazilian mixed martial artist and choreographer
- 1959 – Diane James, British politician
- 1959 – Mario Martone, Italian director and screenwriter
- 1959 – Franz-Peter Tebartz-van Elst, German prelate of the Catholic Church and theologian
- 1959 – Sean Young, American actress and dancer
- 1960 – Ye Jiangchuan, Chinese chess player
- 1961 – Pierre Hermé, French pastry chef and chocolatier
- 1962 – Živko Budimir, Bosnian politician
- 1962 – Rajkumar Hirani, Indian director
- 1962 – Peng Liyuan, wife of Xi Jinping
- 1962 – Gerardo Martino, Argentine footballer and manager
- 1963 – Tim Gavin, Australian rugby player
- 1963 – Timothy Gowers, English mathematician and academic
- 1963 – Beezie Madden, American show jumper
- 1963 – Ming-Na Wen, Chinese-American actress
- 1964 – Boris Dežulović, Croatian journalist and author
- 1964 – Andriy Kalashnykov, Ukrainian wrestler
- 1964 – John MacLean, Canadian ice hockey player and coach
- 1965 – Mike D, American rapper and drummer
- 1965 – Nigel Gibbs, English footballer and coach
- 1965 – Yehuda Glick, American-Israeli Orthodox rabbi
- 1965 – Jimmy Vasser, American race car driver
- 1965 – Yoshiki, Japanese musician
- 1966 – Neil Broad, British tennis player
- 1966 – Kevin Gilbert, American singer-songwriter and musician (died 1996)
- 1966 – Terry Lovejoy, Australian information technologist
- 1966 – Jill Thompson, American author and illustrator
- 1967 – Teoman, Turkish singer
- 1968 – James Dutton, American astronaut
- 1968 – Andrei Kharlov, Russian chess player
- 1968 – David Einhorn, American hedge fund manager
- 1969 – Kristian Ghedina, Italian alpine ski racer
- 1969 – Chris Harris, New Zealand cricketer
- 1969 – Callie Thorne, American actress and producer
- 1970 – Mansour bin Zayed Al Nahyan, deputy prime minister of the United Arab Emirates
- 1970 – Matt Blunt, American lieutenant and politician, 54th Governor of Missouri
- 1970 – Phife Dawg, American rapper (died 2016)
- 1970 – Delia Gonzalez, American boxer
- 1970 – Stéphane Houdet, French wheelchair tennis player
- 1970 – Geoffrey Keezer, American pianist and educator
- 1971 – Joey Galloway, American football player and sportscaster
- 1971 – Joel McHale, American comedian, actor, and producer
- 1972 – Ed Benes, Brazilian comic book artist
- 1972 – Corinne Niogret, French biathlete
- 1972 – Tatiana Turanskaya, Transnistrian politician
- 1973 – Angelica Bridges, American actress and singer
- 1973 – Neil Hodgson, English motorcycle racer and sportscaster
- 1974 – Daniela Anschütz-Thoms, German speed skater
- 1974 – Drew Ginn, Australian rower
- 1975 – Mengke Bateer, Chinese Inner Mongolian basketball player
- 1975 – Dierks Bentley, American singer-songwriter and guitarist
- 1975 – J. D. Drew, American baseball player
- 1975 – Davey Havok, American singer-songwriter
- 1976 – Mohamed Barakat, Egyptian footballer
- 1976 – DeJuan Collins, American basketball player
- 1976 – Dominique Dawes, American gymnast and actress
- 1976 – Tusshar Kapoor, Indian Bollywood actor and producer
- 1976 – Pascal Roller, German basketball player
- 1976 – Nebojša Stefanović, Serbian politician
- 1976 – Doug Viney, New Zealand boxer
- 1976 – Ji Yun-nam, North Korean footballer
- 1977 – Mikhail Ivanov, Russian cross-country skier
- 1977 – Daniel Svensson, Swedish drummer and producer
- 1977 – Josh Turner, American singer-songwriter, guitarist, and actor
- 1978 – Kéné Ndoye, Senegalese track and fielder
- 1979 – Maree Bowden, New Zealand netball player
- 1979 – Kateryna Burmistrova, Ukrainian wrestler
- 1979 – Naide Gomes, Portuguese heptathlete and long jumper
- 1979 – Joseph Hallman, American composer and academic
- 1979 – Anastasiya Kapachinskaya, Russian sprint athlete
- 1979 – Hassan Mostafa, Egyptian footballer
- 1979 – Shalini, Indian actress
- 1979 – Arpad Sterbik, Serbian handball player
- 1980 – Poonsawat Kratingdaenggym, Thai boxer
- 1981 – Carlos Boozer, American basketball player
- 1981 – Yuko Kavaguti, Japanese ice skater
- 1981 – Andrea Riseborough, English actress
- 1981 – Kimberley Walsh, English singer-songwriter and actress
- 1982 – Dương Hồng Sơn, Vietnamese footballer
- 1982 – Rémi Mathis, French historian and curator
- 1982 – Shermine Shahrivar, Iranian model
- 1983 – Future, American rapper
- 1983 – Mónika Kovacsicz, Hungarian handballer
- 1984 – Jeremy Jordan, American actor
- 1984 – Moe Meguro, Japanese curler
- 1984 – Florencia Mutio, Argentine field hockey player
- 1984 – Monique van der Vorst, Dutch cyclist
- 1984 – Lee Yun-yeol, South Korean gamer
- 1985 – Greg Holland, American baseball player
- 1985 – Maria Mukhortova, Russian skater
- 1985 – Aaron Yan, Taiwanese actor and singer
- 1986 – Ashley Fink, American actress and singer
- 1986 – Kōhei Horikoshi, Japanese manga artist
- 1986 – Oliver Sykes, English singer-songwriter
- 1987 – Amelia Rose Blaire, American actress
- 1987 – Mylène Lazare, French swimmer
- 1987 – Nathan Lyon, Australian cricketer
- 1987 – Joëlle Numainville, Canadian cyclist
- 1988 – Marie-Laure Brunet, French biathlete
- 1988 – Aya Medany, Egyptian modern pentathlete.
- 1988 – Max Pacioretty, American ice hockey player
- 1988 – Dariga Shakimova, Kazakhstani boxer
- 1988 – Dušan Tadić, Serbian footballer
- 1988 – Rhys Wakefield, Australian actor and director
- 1989 – Babita Kumari, Indian wrestler
- 1989 – Cody Linley, American actor and singer
- 1989 – Sergei Polunin, Ukrainian ballet dancer
- 1989 – Eduardo Vargas, Chilean footballer
- 1990 – Haley Anderson, American swimmer
- 1990 – Mark Christian, Manx cyclist
- 1990 – Aleksandra Król, Polish snowboarder
- 1991 – Irene Esser, Venezuelan actress and model
- 1991 – Grant Hanley, Scottish footballer
- 1992 – Amit Guluzade, Azerbaijani footballer
- 1992 – Zoltán Harcsa, Hungarian boxer
- 1992 – Kristiina Mäkelä, Finnish triple jumper
- 1992 – Jenna Prandini, American track and field athlete
- 1993 – Anna Prugova, Russian ice hockey player
- 1994 – Timothy Kitum, Kenyan middle-distance runner
- 1995 – Timothy Cheruiyot, Kenyan athlete
- 1995 – Shaolin Sándor Liu, Hungarian short track speed skater
- 1995 – Kyle Snyder, American wrestler
- 1996 – Blaž Janc, Slovenian handballer
- 1996 – Denis Zakaria, Swiss footballer
- 1997 – Levi García, Trinidadian footballer
- 2000 – Connie Talbot, English singer-songwriter
- 2001 – Caty McNally, American tennis player
- 2001 – Adrien Truffert, French footballer
- 2002 – Madisyn Shipman, American actress
- 2004 – Youssoufa Moukoko, Cameroonian-German footballer

== Deaths ==
=== Pre-1600 ===
- 284 – Numerian, Roman emperor
- 763 – Domnall Midi, High King of Ireland (born 743)
- 811 – Li Fan, Chinese chancellor (born 754)
- 855 – Theoktistos, Byzantine courtier
- 869 – Edmund the Martyr, English king (born 841)
- 927 – Xu Wen, Chinese general (born 862)
- 996 – Richard I, duke of Normandy (born 932)
- 1008 – Geoffrey I, duke of Brittany (born 980)
- 1022 – Bernward of Hildesheim, German bishop (born c. 960)
- 1314 – Albert II, German nobleman (born 1240)
- 1316 – John I, king of France and Navarra (born 1316)
- 1400 – Elisabeth of Moravia, margravine of Meissen
- 1480 – Eleanor of Scotland, Scottish princess (born 1433)
- 1518 – Pierre de la Rue, Belgian singer and composer (born 1452)
- 1559 – Lady Frances Brandon, English noblewoman and claimant to the throne of England (born 1517)
- 1591 – Christopher Hatton, English academic and politician, Lord Chancellor of England (born 1540)
- 1593 – Hans Bol, Flemish painter (born 1534)

=== 1601–1900 ===
- 1606 – John Lyly, English poet and courtier
- 1612 – John Harington, English courtier and author (born 1561)
- 1651 – Mikołaj Potocki, Polish nobleman (born 1595)
- 1662 – Leopold Wilhelm, Austrian duke and governor (born 1614)
- 1678 – Karel Dujardin, Dutch Golden Age painter (born 1622)
- 1684 – Pedro Benedit Horruytiner, governor of Spanish Florida (1646–48, and 1651–54) (born 1613)
- 1695 – Zumbi, Brazilian king (born 1655)
- 1704 – Charles Plumier, French botanist and painter (born 1646)
- 1737 – Caroline of Ansbach, queen of England and Ireland (born 1683)
- 1742 – Melchior de Polignac, French cardinal and poet (born 1661)
- 1758 – Johan Helmich Roman, Swedish violinist and composer (born 1694)
- 1764 – Christian Goldbach, Prussian mathematician and theorist (born 1690)
- 1773 – Charles Jennens, English landowner and patron of the arts
- 1778 – Francesco Cetti, Italian priest, zoologist, and mathematician (born 1726)
- 1824 – Carl Axel Arrhenius, Swedish chemist (born 1757)
- 1856 – Farkas Bolyai, Romanian-Hungarian mathematician and academic (born 1775)
- 1864 – Albert Newsam, American painter and illustrator (born 1809)
- 1866 – Otto Karl Berg, German botanist and pharmacist (born 1815)
- 1880 – Léon Cogniet, French painter (born 1794)
- 1882 – Henry Draper, American doctor and astronomer (born 1837)
- 1886 – William Bliss Baker, American painter (born 1859)
- 1889 – August Ahlqvist, Finnish professor, poet, scholar of the Finno-Ugric languages, author, and literary critic (born 1826)
- 1894 – Anton Rubinstein, Russian pianist, composer, and conductor (born 1829)
- 1898 – Sir John Fowler, 1st Baronet, English engineer (born 1817)

=== 1901–present ===
- 1903 – Gaston de Chasseloup-Laubat, French race car driver (born 1867)
- 1903 – Tom Horn, American scout, cowboy, soldier
- 1907 – Paula Modersohn-Becker, German painter (born 1876)
- 1908 – Albert Dietrich, German composer and conductor (born 1829)
- 1908 – Georgy Voronoy, Ukrainian mathematician and academic (born 1868)
- 1910 – Leo Tolstoy, Russian author and playwright (born 1828)
- 1918 – John Bauer, Swedish painter and illustrator (born 1882)
- 1923 – Allen Holubar, American actor and director
- 1923 – Denny Barry Irish Republican, died on hunger Strike 1923 Irish hunger strikes (born 1883)
- 1924 – Ebenezer Cobb Morley, English sportsman and the father of the Football Association and modern football (born 1831)
- 1925 – Alexandra of Denmark, Queen Consort of Edward VII of the United Kingdom, Empress Consort of India (born 1844)
- 1930 – Bill Holland, American track and field athlete (born 1874)
- 1933 – Augustine Birrell, British politician (born 1815)
- 1934 – Willem de Sitter, Dutch mathematician, physicist, and astronomer (born 1872)
- 1935 – John Jellicoe, Royal Navy officer and First Sea Lord (born 1859)
- 1936 – Buenaventura Durruti, Spanish mechanic and activist (born 1896)
- 1936 – José Antonio Primo de Rivera, Spanish lawyer and politician (born 1903)
- 1938 – Maud of Wales, queen of Norway (born 1869)
- 1938 – Edwin Hall, American physicist (born 1855)
- 1940 – Arturo Bocchini, Chief of Police under the Fascist regime of Benito Mussolini (born 1880)
- 1940 – Tim Coleman, English footballer (born 1881)
- 1940 – Robert Lane, Canadian soccer player (born 1882)
- 1941 – Elmar Muuk, Estonian linguist and author (born 1901)
- 1944 – Maria Jacobini, Italian actress (born 1892)
- 1945 – Francis William Aston, English chemist and physicist, Nobel Prize laureate (born 1877)
- 1946 – I Gusti Ngurah Rai, Indonesian officer (born 1917)
- 1947 – Wolfgang Borchert, German author and playwright (born 1921)
- 1950 – Francesco Cilea, Italian composer (born 1866)
- 1952 – Benedetto Croce, Italian philosopher and politician (born 1866)
- 1954 – Clyde Vernon Cessna, American pilot and engineer, founded the Cessna Aircraft Corporation (born 1879)
- 1957 – Mstislav Dobuzhinsky, Russian-Lithuanian painter and illustrator (born 1875)
- 1959 – Sylvia Lopez, French model and actress (born 1933)
- 1960 – Ya'akov Cahan, Israeli writer and translator (born 1881)
- 1972 – Ennio Flaiano, Italian writer and journalist (born 1910)
- 1973 – Allan Sherman, American actor, comedian, and producer (born 1924)
- 1975 – Francisco Franco, Spanish general and dictator, Prime Minister of Spain (born 1892)
- 1976 – Martin D'Arcy, English Jesuit priest (born 1888)
- 1976 – Trofim Lysenko, Ukrainian-Russian biologist and agronomist (born 1898)
- 1978 – Giorgio de Chirico, Greek-Italian painter and sculptor (born 1888)
- 1978 – Vasilisk Gnedov, Russian soldier and poet (born 1890)
- 1980 – John McEwen, Australian lawyer and politician, 18th Prime Minister of Australia (born 1900)
- 1981 – Frank Sheed, Australian-British Catholic writer and apologist (born 1981)
- 1983 – Marcel Dalio, French actor and playwright (born 1900)
- 1983 – Richard Loo, Chinese-American actor (born 1903)
- 1984 – Carlo Campanini, Italian actor, singer and comedian (born 1904)
- 1984 – Kristian Djurhuus, Faroese politician, 2nd Prime Minister of the Faroe Islands (born 1895)
- 1984 – Faiz Ahmad Faiz, Pakistani journalist and poet (born 1911)
- 1989 – Lynn Bari, American actress (born 1913)
- 1992 – Raul Renter, Estonian economist and chess player (born 1920)
- 1994 – Jānis Krūmiņš, Latvian basketball player (born 1930)
- 1995 – Sergei Grinkov, Russian figure skater (born 1967)
- 1995 – Robie Macauley, American editor, novelist and critic (born 1919)
- 1997 – Dick Littlefield, American baseball player (born 1926)
- 1997 – Robert Palmer, American saxophonist, producer, and author (born 1945)
- 1998 – Roland Alphonso, Jamaican saxophonist (born 1931)
- 1998 – Galina Starovoytova, Russian ethnographer and politician (born 1946)
- 1999 – Amintore Fanfani, Italian journalist and politician, 32nd Prime Minister of Italy (born 1908)
- 2000 – Mike Muuss, American computer programmer, created Ping (born 1958)
- 2000 – Kalle Päätalo, Finnish author (born 1919)
- 2000 – Barbara Sobotta, Polish athlete (born 1936)
- 2002 – Kakhi Asatiani, Georgian footballer (born 1947)
- 2003 – Robert Addie, English actor (born 1960)
- 2003 – David Dacko, African educator and politician, 1st President of the Central African Republic (born 1930)
- 2003 – Eugene Kleiner, American businessman, co-founded Kleiner Perkins Caufield & Byers (born 1923)
- 2004 – Ancel Keys, American physiologist (born 1904)
- 2005 – Manouchehr Atashi, Iranian journalist and poet (born 1931)
- 2005 – James King, American tenor (born 1925)
- 2005 – Chris Whitley, American singer-songwriter and guitarist (born 1960)
- 2006 – Robert Altman, American director, producer, and screenwriter (born 1925)
- 2006 – Zoia Ceaușescu, Romanian mathematician and academic (born 1950)
- 2006 – Donald Hamilton, American author (born 1916)
- 2007 – Kenneth S. Kleinknecht, NASA manager (born 1919)
- 2007 – Ian Smith, Rhodesian lieutenant and politician, 1st Prime Minister of Rhodesia (born 1919)
- 2009 – Lino Lacedelli, Italian mountaineer (born 1925)
- 2010 – Chalmers Johnson, American author and scholar (born 1931)
- 2012 – Kaspars Astašenko, Latvian ice hockey player (born 1975)
- 2012 – William Grut, Swedish pentathlete (born 1914)
- 2012 – Pete La Roca, American jazz drummer (born 1938)
- 2012 – Ivan Kušan, Croatian writer (born 1933)
- 2013 – Sylvia Browne, American author (born 1936)
- 2013 – Dieter Hildebrandt, Polish-German actor and screenwriter (born 1927)
- 2014 – Cayetana Fitz-James Stuart, 18th Duchess of Alba (born 1926)
- 2015 – Keith Michell, Australian actor (born 1926)
- 2015 – Jim Perry, American-Canadian singer and game show host (born 1933)
- 2015 – Kitanoumi Toshimitsu, Japanese sumo wrestler, the 55th Yokozuna (born 1953)
- 2016 – Gabriel Badilla, Costa Rican footballer (born 1984)
- 2016 – Gene Guarilia, American basketball player (born 1937)
- 2016 – Konstantinos Stephanopoulos, Greek statesman (born 1926)
- 2016 – William Trevor, Irish novelist, playwright, and short story writer (born 1928)
- 2017 – Peter Berling, German actor, film producer and writer (born 1934)
- 2018 – James H. Billington, 13th Librarian of Congress (born 1929)
- 2018 – Aaron Klug, Lithuanian-English chemist and biophysicist, Nobel Prize laureate (born 1926)
- 2019 – Wataru Misaka, American basketball player (born 1923)
- 2020 – Jan Morris, Welsh historian, author and travel writer (born 1926)
- 2022 – Hebe de Bonafini, Argentine activist, founder of Mothers of Plaza de Mayo (born 1928)
- 2024 – Ursula Haverbeck, German Holocaust denier (born 1928)
- 2024 – Andy Paley, American songwriter (born 1952)
- 2024 – John Prescott, British sailor and politician, Deputy Prime Minister of the United Kingdom (born 1938)
- 2024 – Jodi Rell, American politician, 87th Governor of Connecticut (born 1946)

== Holidays and observances ==
- 20-N (Spain)
- Africa Industrialization Day (international)
- Black Awareness Day (Brazil)
- Children's Day (World Children's Day)
- Christian feast day:
  - Agapius
  - Ambrose Traversari
  - Blessed Anacleto González Flores, José Sánchez del Río, and companions (Martyrs of Cristero War)
  - Bernward of Hildesheim
  - Dasius of Durostorum
  - Edmund the Martyr
  - Felec (or Felix) of Cornwall
  - Gregory of Dekapolis
  - Blessed Josaphata Hordashevska (Ukrainian Greek Catholic Church)
  - Blessed Maria Fortunata Viti
  - Solutor, Octavius, and Adventor
  - Theonestus of Vercelli
  - November 20 (Eastern Orthodox liturgics)
- Earliest day on which the Feast of Christ the King can fall, while November 26 is the latest; celebrated on the last Sunday before Advent. (Roman Catholic Church)
- National Sovereignty Day (Argentina)
- Day of the Mexican Revolution (Mexico)
- Royal Thai Navy Day (Thailand)
- Saint Verhaegen (Brussels)
- Teachers' Day or Ngày nhà giáo Việt Nam (Vietnam)
- Transgender Day of Remembrance (LGBTQ community)
