= Popular Prakashan =

Publishing house in India

- Founded: 1924
- Founder: Ganesh R. Bhatkal
- Successor: Ramdas Bhatkal, Harsha Bhatkal
- Headquarters location: Mumbai
- Publication types: Books, magazines
- Official website: popularprakashan.com

Popular Prakashan is an Indian independent publisher and bookseller founded in Bombay in 1924.

== History ==
In 1924, founder Ganesh R. Bhatkal, a former employee of Oxford University Press India, established the Popular Book Depot as an independent bookseller. In 1962, his successors Sadanand and Ramdas G. Bhatkal created Popular Prakashan Pvt. Ltd. as a publishing company.

== Publications ==
=== Cookery ===
Popular Prakashan specialises in cookery titles. Sanjeev Kapoor of Khana Khazana is Popular's best-selling author and Popular has published more than 85 books by him. These are also available in Hindi, Marathi and Gujarati. Rasachandrika: Saraswat Cookery Book is a great compilation of delectable recipes from Maharashtrian and Konkani cuisine. Asha Khatau and Jeroo Mehta have also been published through Popular.

=== Arts, culture and women's studies ===
In 1990, Popular Prakashan set up a Kolkata-based associate firm, Bhatkal and Sen, for specialized publishing in the fields of culture and women's studies. These books focus primarily on contemporary debates, grassroots movements, politics and culture as viewed from a critical and progressive standpoint. Popular Prakashan's subsidiary, Foundation B&G, also publishes books on the arts.

=== Books in Marathi ===
Popular Prakashan has published titles in Marathi, concentrating mainly on fiction, drama, literary criticism and poetry. Writers in this language include Vinda Karandikar, Gangadhar Gadgil, G.A. Kulkarni, Nirmala Deshpande and Kamal Desai.

=== Children's books ===
Popular have published a series of storybooks in association with Chandamama, the oldest children's magazine in India. They have also published the Brainworks series of books in association with Leopard Learning Systems, USA, as well as other early learning titles. Shobhaa De's book for teenagers, S's Secret, was released by Popular Prakashan in December 2009. It has been translated into Hindi and Marathi.

== Joint ventures ==
Popular shares a relationship with Encyclopædia Britannica in India with whom it has published over a hundred titles in the last few years. With National Geographic Popular has published a series on animal life, the human body, weather and the universe. These include Life Cycles, Ecosystems and Animal Adaptations. They have also published early learning books in collaboration with Modern Publishing, USA. Popular Prakashan have also published children's books in conjunction with Disney.

In partnership with DeAgostini, Popular Prakashan has published the I Get It children's reference series and English-language course English Interactive.
