= Nirmal Selvamony =

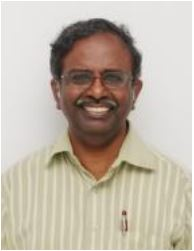
- Selvamony, circa 2016
- Pronunciation: nir·muhl sel·vuh muh·nee
- Born: 20 November 1953 (age 72)
- Education: PhD
- Alma mater: University of Madras
- Occupation: Academician
- Spouse: Ruckmani
- Children: Padini; Madhini

Nirmal Selvamony (born 29 April 1953) is an Indian academician and scholar with specialization in the field of ecocriticism.

When he retired from Central University of Tamil Nadu in April 2018, he was Professor and Head of the Department of English Studies and Dean of the School of Social Sciences and Humanities. His major interests include Literary Theory, Ecotheory, music and drama. He is the current president of tiNai (formerly, OSLE-India). He obtained in 1988, his Ph.D. from the University of Madras for his dissertation, "Literary Personhood in tolkappiyam." He completed BA from Scott Christian College with First Rank in Madurai Kamaraj University. He published 14 books, 50 chapters in books, more than 75 research papers in journals and more than 100 conference papers. He has taught in universities in India and abroad. He got North East Ohio Tamil Sangam Life Time Achievement Award in 2011.

== Education ==
Selvamony was educated at Margoschis Higher Secondary School (in Nazareth, Thoothukudi district). He then joined Scott Christian College (in Nagercoil) in 1973 and graduated with a Bachelor of Arts (English) degree in 1976. He then joined Madras Christian College, Chennai and obtained an MA in 1978. In the same year, he joined Christian Institute for the Study of Religion and Society (CISRS), Bangalore as a research fellow and submitted an essay titled Personhood in Art in 1982.

In 1980, he commenced his Ph.D. in the University of Madras and submitted his dissertation titled "Literary Personhood in tolkāppiyam" in 1988.

== Career ==
Selvamony began his academic career in November 1982 as an assistant professor at the Department of English, Madras Christian College affiliated to the University of Madras. In 1989 he became a senior-grade lecturer. During 1994–95, he was a visiting scholar in Davidson College, NC, USA.

In 2006, he became Associate Profossor in the Madras Christian College. He was invited to start the first department (English Studies) of a new Central University in Tamil Nadu (CUTN) in 2009. On 21 April 2010, he voluntarily retired from his regular position at Madras Christian College, in order to develop the department at CUTN. He was Professor at the department of English at Cleveland State University, Ohio, USA, during the Spring semester of 2010. In 2011, he returned to the Department of English Studies in CUTN. Since then he has been the Head of the department of English Studies in that university.

He was also visiting faculty in University of Hawaii, USA, Queen's University, Belfast, N. Ireland. Elmhurst College, Chicago, USA, Free University and Dortmund University in West Germany.

== Contribution ==
Selvamony has introduced the course, Ecocriticism for the first time in the Indian university system and founded a forum now known as tiNai (formerly, OSLE-India). It is he who coined the term "Neo-tiNai poetics," an ecocritical theory, which is based on the tiNai theory of Classical Tamil Literature. He also started a journal ('Indian Journal of Ecocriticism') to promote this course. He was also the first to introduce the courses, Tamil Poetics, Tamil Musicology and Music and Literature in the University of Madras. He has revived the traditional Indian philosophical tradition called “kaaTci” (in a publication titled 'tamizk kaaTci neRiyiyal', 1996 [The Methodology of Tamil Philosophy] which precedes tolkaappiyam. He introduced tiNai (ecoregional) musicology that studies the music of the primordial biomic world regions (see: essays published in the reports of Tamil Isaic Cankam, Chennai, 1991, 1995, 1996).

For more than 35 years he has researched 'tiNai' way of life and published several papers on various aspects of it attempting to reconstruct it as an alternative way of life. He has played the guitar professionally in India and also in musical performances in India, USA, Germany and Hong Kong. Supplementing his doctoral research in dramatic theory, he has scripted, and directed plays and composed music for them.

He was also part of the panels constituted by the Government of Tamil Nadu for establishing tinai-based genetic parks.

== Awards and achievements ==
Year	Award	Agency	Note(s)
1969	First Class	Māṇavar maṉṟam (Students’ Forum) Examination in Tamil, Madras.	
1976	First Rank in BA	Madurai Kamaraj University	
1986	Best out going Student	UGC Summer Institute in English Language Teaching	Sponsored by British Council Division, Chennai and CIEFL, Hyderabad, at Department of English, University of Madras from 13 October to 8 November 1986.
2000	Best Monograph	International School of Dravidian Linguistics, Thiruvananthapuram	For the book, Persona in Tolkāppiyam
2011	Life-time Achievement	Northeast Ohio Tamil Sangam	
2021	Ciṟanta tamiḻ aṟiñar virutu (Best Tamil Scholar Award)	Doctor Subramaniam Pazhaniyandi Endowment, Indian Medical Association, Tiruchirappalli.	Given on 7 February

== Music and theatre ==
Selvamony's other interests include music and drama. In 2002, he was the secretary of Tamizicaiyiyal Uyarnilai Aayvu Manram (Forum for Advanced Research in Tamil Musicology), Madurai.

In 2015, he organised Theater Workshop with Kanta Kochhar-Lindgren, at Central University of Tamil Nadu, 18–23 March 2015.

== Television ==
Year	Date	Episode	Program	Channel	Host
2000	13 October	“On Literature”	?	Jaya TV	?
2006	29 June	"Red Earth Pouring Rain" (On Monsoons in India)	NDTV Special	NDTV	Radhika Bordia
2007	September	Tinai	Cevvi	Makkal TV	
2012	9 December	S14 E12: "The concern for English in India"	Neeya Naana	Vijay TV	Gopinath Chandran

== Filmography ==
Selvamony appears in Āpirakām paṇṭitariṉ karuṇāmirta cākaram: Tamiḻicai varalāṟum icaittamiḻ nūlum (Abraham Pandit's Karunamirtha Sagaram: A History of Tamil Music and a Musical Tamil Book), a 2022 documentary by Kutti Revathi on the work of Tamil musicologist Abraham Pandithar (1859-1919).

== Legacy ==
R. Abilash, who won the Yuva Puraskar award for Tamil in 2014, remembered that during his postgraduate years, Selvamony's mentorship helped him "in many ways"

Tamil Nadu-born American writer Subramanian Shankar described the nature of Selvamony's work as "unorthodox", adding that "It moves in many different directions...A running theme in his [Selvamony's] work is this desire to really think about industrialism, urbanism, modernity, the state society [etc.,]".

Feminist activist V. Geetha said "He (Selvamony) introduced to us [her classmates] the traditions of thoughts unknown to us - especially cultural and philosophical traditions related to religion".

== Family ==
Selvamony's wife Ruckmani is a Reader in Pharmacology at Chengalpattu Medical College. The couple has two daughters, Padini and Madhini.
