= Bahram Dehghanyar =

Iranian musician and film composer

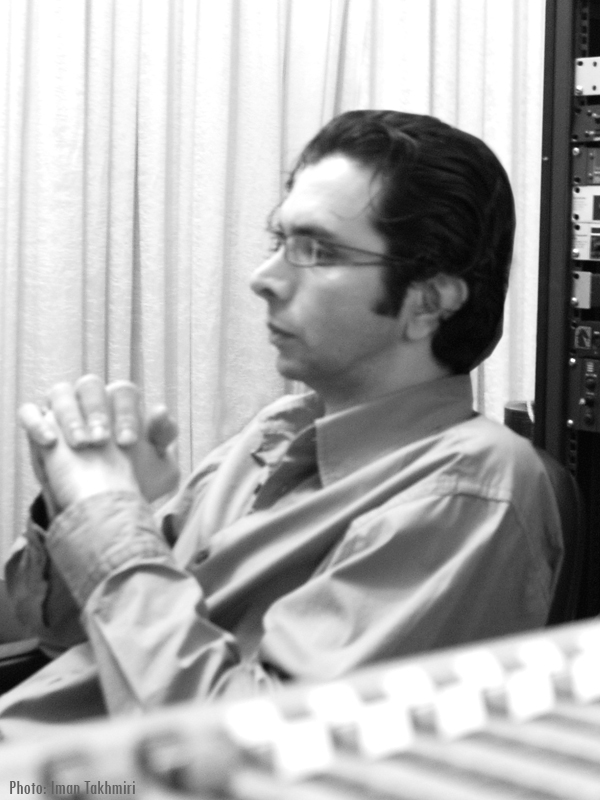
- Bahram Dehghanyar, 2006

Background information
- Birth name: بهرام دهقانیار
- Born: July 7, 1965 (age 59)
- Origin: Tehran, Iran
- Genres: Film scores Classical; Pop; Jazz; Electronic; New-age
- Occupation(s): Composer, Songwriter
- Instrument(s): Piano, Keyboard
- Years active: 1983–present

Bahram Dehghanyar (Persian: بهرام دهقانیار, born July 7, 1965) is an Iranian musician and film composer.

His first work in Iranian Broadcasting governmental television was the score for a children's serial, Grandma's Hut (خونه‌ی مادربزرگه). He has also composed the scores for Patriarchy (پدرسالار), Spouses (همسران), The Green House (خانه‌ی سبز), and Hotel (هتل).

== Biography ==
=== Early life ===
Bahram Dehghanyar was born on July 7, 1965, in Tehran, Iran. His father, General Shahab Dehghanyar was an officer in the army and his older brother is a skilled pianist.

== TV series ==
- 2010s
  - Heyat Modireh (2018) (هیأت مدیره)
  - Dar Hashieh (2015) (در حاشیه)
  - Ab Paria (2013) (آب پریا)
  - My Villa (2012) (ویلای من)
  - Bitter Coffee (2010) (قهوه تلخ)
- 2000s
  - All My Children (2009) (همه‌ی بچه‌های من )
  - Mozaffar's Treasure (2007) (Not released) (گنج مظفر )
  - 1000-Faced Man (2007) (مرد هزارچهره )
  - Mozaffar's Garden (2006) (باغ مظفر )
  - "Hod Hod" Bookstore (2006) (کتابفروشی هدهد )
  - "Barareh" Nights (2005) (شبهای برره )
  - Fasten Your Seatbelts! (2002) (کمربندها را ببندید ) | The opening credits of this series are based on the song Basame Mucho by Consuelo Velasquez. This song was first recorded by Emilio Tuero and made famous by Lucho Gatica. Sonny Skyler wrote an English version of Mocho, which is semantically different from the Spanish version, which was covered by singers such as Dean Martin, Michael Bublé, Nat King Cole, and The Beatles. Although its first English performance was performed by Pedro Infante in 1950.
- 1990s
  - The Green House (1998) (خانه‌ی سبز )
  - Car No. Tehran-11 (1998) (۱۱ خودرو تهران )
  - Spouses (1994) (همسران )
  - The tales of "ZiZiGuLu" Children TV Series (قصه‌های تابه‌تا: زی‌زی‌گولو )
  - Hotel (هتل )
- 1980s
  - Once Upon a Time (زیر گنبد کبود )
  - "Ziba" Barbershop (1989) (آرایشگاه زیبا )
  - Patriarchy (پدرسالار )
  - Grandma's Hut (1985) Children TV Series (خونه‌ی مادریزرگه )

== Filmography ==
- 2000s
  - Burglary (TV movie) (2007) (سرقت )
  - "Bemani VII" (TV movie) (2007) (بمانی هفتم )
  - Mother (TV movie) (2007) (مادر )
  - Devil's Imitator (2007) (Not released) (مقلد شیطان )
  - Mr. Thief (2006) (آقای دزد )
  - The Performer (TV movie) (2006) (نوازنده )
  - "Mahya" (2006) (محیا )
  - Secrets (2005) (رازها )
  - At the Doors (2005) (دربه‌درها )
- 1990s
  - The Starry Sky (1999) (آسمان پرستاره )
  - Fragile Love (Glass Love) (1999) (عشق شيشه اي )
  - Legion (1998) (لژیون )
  - Beyond the Mirror (1997) (آن سوی آینه )
  - Invisible Webs (1997) (تارهای نامرئی)
  - The Nervure (1997) (شاهرگ )
  - "Ebrahim" (1996) (ابراهيم )
  - The Green Hell (1995) (جهنم سبز )
  - Cow Horn (1995) (شاخ گاو )
  - The City's Children (1991) (شهر در دست بچه‌ها)
- 1980s
  - The Inheritance (1988) (ارثيه )
