= Mani Nouri =

Iranian/Canadian actor and director

- مانی نوری
- Born: Tehran, Iran
- Occupations: Actor, film director

Mani Nouri (Persian: مانی نوری; born in Tehran, Iran) is an Iranian/Canadian actor and director. Since 2006, he has been working on modern visual projects. He was chosen the second best adolescent actor of the decade in the Middle East.

== Career ==
He started his acting career with the television series Zizigooloo when he was six years old. Zizigooloo became very popular in Iran and Iranian culture. He then acted in movies such as Sweet Jam and Dear, I Am Not In Tune. He has won awards for his acting from Isfahan film festival and Iranian national TV channels. He has experiences in theatre with Davood Rashidi (The Third Richard). His directing career started in 2003-2004 when he directed a short movie called The Tree of Pain.

== Television series ==
- 1994: Tabeta Tales, as Zizigulu, the main protagonist. The show was directed by Marzie Boroomand
- 1995: Jong 77, Directed by Mehran Modiri
- 1996: Hotel, Directed by Marzie Boroomand
- 1998: Gholamhosseinkhan, Directed by Marzie Boroomand
- 1999: Tehran 11, Directed by Marzie Boroomand
- 2000: La Maison, Directed by Masood Keramati
- 2001: Nowrooz Stories, Directed by Marzie Boroomand and Masood Keramati
- 2002: Afagh Mother's House, Directed by Rasoul Najafian
- 2002-3: Stars, Mani Nouri
- 2003: The Magic Land, Directed by Siamak Shayeghi
- 2007: Innocent, Mani Nouri
- 2010-2011: Us, Mani Nouri
- 2012: Yallan, Mani Nouri
- 2013: Hate on sale, Directed by Khez
- 2014: The Last King, Directed by Hossein Soheilizadeh

== Filmography ==
- 1994: Escape from Life, directed by Basha Art Group
- 1999: Telephone, directed by Masoud Keramati
- 2000: Sweet Jam, directed by Marzie Boroomand
- 2001: Chérie, je ne suis pas dans mon assiette (aka Dear, i am not in tune), directed by Mohammad Reza Honarmand
- 2012: Wolves (banned Iranian movie)
- 2013: Mad House, Mathilda Ghezelkhoo
- 2014: City of Mice 2, Voice of Blacky, Marzieh Boroomand

== Theater ==
- 1999-2000: Richard III, directed by Davood Rashidi
- 2008-2009: le monde de la rue (aka Street People)

== Short movies and shows ==
- 2000: Hasan Kachal
- 2003: The Green Planet

== Writer-director ==
- 2002-2003: Saint-Paul et ses adultes
- 2003: The Tree of Pain
- 2004: W
- 2005: La scène comme tell
- 2008: Le Fil de Destin (The destiny)
- 2008: Les Larmes noires (Black Tears)
- 2008: Safoora
- 2008-2009: Les tristesses d'Iran (Iran's sadness)
- 2009: Momo : la victime d'immigration (Experimental)
- 2010: Arezoo (Experimental)
- 2011-12: Une place sans ciel aka The Black Sky
- 2013: I am Modern (Mockumentary)
- 2015-2018: Abbas Abbas...Send Help! (long feature film) (Banned in Iran)
- 2018: Feminin (long feature film)
