= Patriarchy (book) =

- Author: V. Geetha
- Language: English
- Genre: Academic
- Published: 2007
- Publisher: Stree
- Publication place: India
- ISBN: 9788185604466
- OCLC: 154204766

Patriarchy is a 2007 book by V. Geetha, an academic activist and author on the subject of patriarchy in India. The book, written from the female perspective, is part of the "Theorizing Feminism" series published by Stree (an imprint of Bhatkal and Sen). Three editions have been published.

== Background ==
In India, patriarchy disrupts women's lives. According to Geetha, "Sexual violence has been blamed on a patriarchal backlash where the term 'patriarchy' is often synonymous with 'tradition'". Feminism has a long tradition of examining the concept of patriarchy, and the book attempts to demonstrate that the nature, effect, and meanings of male authority and power can only be understood through the idea of patriarchy.

== Description ==
Patriarchy introduces readers to concepts in feminist theory involving patriarchy. According to Geetha, "The book does not propound a theory of patriarchy; rather, it points to those areas of reality and traditions of knowledge that we might need to draw upon to define patriarchy. It indicates the need for theory-making, and shows how this may be done. Its intent is fundamentally pedagogical and is a beginners' text to help the reader consider patriarchy in all its aspects".

She describes how knowledge about patriarchy cannot be easily separated from the feminist desire to generate such knowledge: "By understanding patriarchy, the notions of production and reproduction are important concepts". Geetha highlights unique aspects of Indian society, such as kinship structures and the caste system, to better understand patriarchy. According to the author, "A woman's identity as a citizen and rights to equality are undercut by the fact of their gender".

Geetha theorizes that patriarchal power "is not merely coercive ... Cultural and sexual norms constitute the everyday exercise of patriarchal power". She also writes, "Sexuality is a crucial link between caste and gender, so that marriage and sexual rules are not only set by caste, but also the notions of right pleasure are defined by it."

== Academic use ==
Patriarchy has been widely cited in books and papers about feminism and gender studies, especially relative to India, and has been used at the university level.
