= Bani Basu =

Indian writer

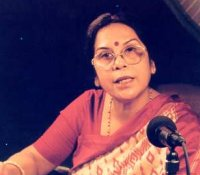
- Bani Basu
- Born: 11 March 1939 (age 87); Calcutta, British India
- Occupations: Writer, professor in English
- Notable work: Maitreya Jātak, Khanamihirer Dhipi, Gandharbi, Ekushe paa

Bani Basu (born 11 March 1939 Bengali: বাণী বসু) is a prolific Bengali Indian author, essayist, critic, poet, translator and professor.

== Life ==
She received her formal education from the well-known Lady Brabourne College, Scottish Church College and at the University of Calcutta where she received M.A. in English.

== Career ==
Basu began her career as a novelist with the publication of Janmabhoomi Mātribhoomi. A prolific writer, she started her professional career as an author from 1980, first in “Anandamala”, a juvenile magazine, then in “Desh” and other periodicals of the time.

She is known as a novelist, short story writer, essayist, and writings for children and teenagers. Some of her fictions have been made into films & TV Serials. The broad range of her fiction deals with gender, history, mythology, society, psychology, adolescence, music, sexual orientation, the supernatural, and more. Her major works include Swet Pātharer Thālā (A Plate of White Marble), Ekushe Pā (Turning Twenty One), Maitreya Jātak (published as The Birth of the Maitreya by Stree), Gāndharvi, Pancham Purush (The Fifth Generation) and Ashtam Garbha (The Eighth Pregnancy). She also writes poetry, and translates extensively into Bengali.

She was awarded the Tarashankar Award for Antarghāt (Treason), and the Ananda Purashkar for Maitreya Jātak. She is also the recipient of the Sushila Devi Birla Award and the Sahitya Setu Puraskar. In 2010 she was awarded Sahitya Academy for her contributions to Bengali literature.

== Bibliography ==
- Swet Pātharer Thālā (1990)
- Gāndharbi (1993)
- Mohanā (1993)
- Ekushe Pā (1994)
- Maitreya Jātak (1999)
- Upanyās Panchak (1999)
- Ashtam Garbha (2000)
- Antarghāt
- Pancham Purush
- Khanamihirer Dhipi (2009)
- Kharap Chele
- Meyeli Addar Halchal

== Film and television serial based on her books ==
- Swet Patherer Thala (Film)
- Gandharvi (Film and TV Serial)
- Swet Patherer Thala (TV Serial)
- Ekushe Pa (TV Serial)
- Nandita (Tele Fim)
- Mrs Gupta Ra (Tele Film)
- Jakhan Chand (Tele Film)
- Bhab Murti (Tele Film)
- Balleygunge Court (Tele Film)
- Shakhambherir Dwip (TV Serial)
- Amrita (TV Serial)

- Aapish (film)

== Awards ==
- Tara Sankar Award (1991)
- Sahitya Setu Chandra (1995)
- Siromoni Award (1997)
- Ananda Puraskar (1997)
- Bankim Award (1998)
- Mahadevi Birla Award (1998)
- Katha Award (2003)
- Pratima Mitra Smiti Award (2007)
- Kabi Kritibas Sahitya Award (2008)
- Bhuban Mohini Dasi Swarna Padak, Calcutta University (2008)
- Sachindra Nath Sahitya Award
- Sahitya Akademi Award (2010)
