= Chhaya Datar =

Marathi writer (born 1944)

- Born: 1944 (age 81–82); India
- Occupations: Activist, writer and feminist

Chhaya Datar (also Chāyā Dātāra born 1944) is an Indian activist, writer and feminist. Datar writes in Marathi and English.

== Career ==
Datar began writing and becoming politically active out of frustration as living as a housewife. She wrote her first collection of short stories in Marathi, Goshta Sādhī Saral Sopī in 1972 and her second, Vartulacha Ant in 1977. She is also one of the founders of a publishing group based in Bombay, called Stri Uvach (A Woman Said). After her short stories, she went on to work on studying women's issues. Earning a scholarship to study in the Netherlands, she completed a master's degree at the International Institute of Social Studies of Rotterdam in 1981. She returned to India and was one of the founders of an anti-violence group called the Forum Against Rape. In 1988, she became a women's studies lecturer at the Tata Institute of Social Sciences. Later she earned a PhD from the SNDT Women's University, and became head of the women's studies department at the Tata Institute.

In Waging Change: Women Tobacco Workers in Nipani Organize (1989), Datar examines women's struggles for both political and economic justice in Nipani through the context of cigarette workers. In Signs, reviewer Chandra Talpade Mohanty, writes that Datar's Waging Change is an "elegantly crafted, detailed analysis of the organizational history of women bidi (hand-rolled cigarette) workers." In her autobiographical story, In Search of Myself, she examines her own experiences and describes how communing with one's own tribal space allows women to have a sense of freedom. She also describes in this story how tribal women find themselves by sharing their own experiences. Datar also discusses Dalit feminism in her works.

Datar has been published in Contemporary Sociology, Indian Journal of Gender Studies, Economic and Political Weekly, and has contributed to the journal published by Men Against Violence and Abuse (MAVA), Purush Spandana. She released Tarihi Shesh on International Women's Day 2017.

== Selected bibliography ==
- Goshṭa sādhī, saraḷa, sopī (in Marathi). Pune: Menakā Prakāśana. 1973. OCLC 31095346.
- Mītaruṇī (in Marathi). Mumbai: Abhinava Prakāśana. 1979. OCLC 499533971.
- Waging Change: Women Tobacco Workers in Nipani Organize. New Delhi: Kali for Women. 1989. ISBN 978-8185107110.
