= S. Shankar (writer) =

Indian writer (born 1962)

Subramanian Shankar (born July 28, 1962, Salem, India) is a writer of Indian descent. He has written novels and scholarly studies. He has also translated into English from Tamil, his mother tongue. He has lived in the US since 1987 and teaches at the University of Hawaii at Manoa. He was honored by the University of Houston (Downtown) as Scholar in Residence in 2016.

Shankar has written two novels and criticism on postcolonial literature. His novels are A Map of Where I Live (1997) and No End to the Journey (2005), which was translated into Spanish in 2009 as El Viaje No Terminado. His work of scholarship Flesh and Fish Blood: Postcolonialism, Translation and the Vernacular (2012) won Honorable Mention from the American Comparative Literature Association in 2013. In its citation the ACLA said: "Over-all, Shankar’s book combines theoretical sophistication, deftness of interpretation and an impressive clarity and cogency of argument." Another significant book is Crossing into America; The New Literature of Immigration (2005), which he coedited with Louis Mendoza.

Shankar is the translator of the renowned Tamil play Thaneer, written by Komal Swaminathan. His translation was published by Seagull Books in 2001 as Water!. It was staged by the Madras Players in 2012.
