= Saroj Pathak =

Gujarati writer

Saroj Pathak (1 June 1929 – 16 April 1989) was Gujarati novelist, story writer and essayist from Gujarat, India.

== Life ==
Saroj Pathak was born on 1 June 1929 to Narandas Uddeshi in Jakhau in Cutch State (now Kutch district, Gujarat). She completed her primary and secondary school from Bombay (now Mumbai). She matriculated in 1947. She completed BA in Gujarati in 1960 and MA in 1964 from Gujarat University. She was associated with Akashvani in 1956–57. She was also associated with Soviet Information Service in 1957–58. She was professor at college in Bardoli from 1964. She died in Bardoli on 16 April 1989.

== Works ==
Her husband was a humourist and used to write stories which inspired her to write. Her first story, Nahi Andharu, Nahi Ajvalu was published in Jivanmadhuri magazine. Her Sarika Pinjarstha was praised. Her first short story collection Prem Ghata Zuk Aai (1959) was published by Chetan Publishers which earned her prize from Government of Bombay State. Preet Bandhani (1961) was published with help of her husband. Maro Asbab, Maro Rag (1966) contains social stories. Virat Tapaku (1966) brought her recognition as modernist writer. Hukamno Ekko, Tathastu (1972) are her other story collections.

Nightmare (1969) was her first novel. Her other novels are Nihsesh (1979), Priy Poonam (1980), Time Bomb (1987), Likhitang (1988).

She wrote essays in Nari Sansar column in Gujarat Mitra. Her essays are collected in Sansarika (1967) and Arvachina (1976). Pratipada (1962) is her work of translation.

== Personal life ==
She married Ramanlal Pathak, Gujarati humourist in 1950.
