= Sulekha Hussain =

Indian Urdu poet

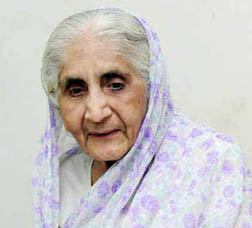
- Born: 1 January 1930; Mattancherry, Kochi, India
- Died: 15 July 2014 (aged 84); Vaduthala, Kochi
- Occupation: Writer

Sulekha Hussain (Urdu: زلیخا حسین) (1930 – 15 July 2014) was an acclaimed Urdu novelist from India. One of her granddaughters, Nimi Farook, is married to a Canadian citizen, Yasser Mohammed Ali Jinna, and lives currently in Toronto. Hussain wrote many novels and short stories. She was nominated to the committee awarding fellowships in Urdu language by the Union Cultural Affairs Ministry in 2012.

== Early life ==
She was born in Mattancherry, Kerala, India in 1930 to a Katchi Memon family. She lost her parents at very young age and was brought up by her grandfather Jani Sait. Her educational qualification was 4th standard, and studied in Zanana Madressa (Asia Bahi madressa), Mattancherry, Kochi. She published many novels and short stories in Urdu language that were appreciated in Urdu circles. Her writings have reached a large number of readers in Pakistan, Bangladesh, the Middle East, and north Indian states. Her novels Mere Sanam, Rah Akeli, and Aapa are famous works.

== Publications ==
Novels

- Rah Akeli
- Dishvar Huva Jeena
- Ek Khyab Hakhikhath
- Marla he Kali

== See also ==
- List of Indian writers
- List of Urdu writers
