= Tabeta Tales =

- Written by: Marzieh Boroomand, Reza Fayazi
- Directed by: Marzieh Boroomand and Shahin Babapur
- Starring: Mani Nouri
- Music by: Saeed Babaee (113 shorts); Rahim Ghashgahee (73rd short)
- Country of origin: Iran
- Original language: Persian
- No. of seasons: 1
- No. of episodes: 30

Production
- Running time: approx. 45 minutes (per episode)

Original release
- Release: March 3, 1995 – September 13, 2008

Ta-Be-Ta tales (Persian: قصه‌های تابه‌تا) also known as Zizigulu (Persian: زی‌زی گولو) is an Iranian children's live-action comedy puppet television series directed by Marzieh Boroumand. This series began in the early 1994, and aired on Iranian television until the spring of 1995.

== Summary ==
Zizigulu is a pink-colored fictional character who is believed to have resided on the planet Ta-be-Ta before ending up on Earth and was adopted by Leyli Rashidi and Agha Y Pedar, a newlywed couple. Her full name is "Zizigulu Aasi Paasi Deraakutaa Taa-be-Taa" which she often uses to disappear and appear in certain areas. However, due to the complexity of her full name, she is wrongfully referred to as "Aasi-Poolika" by their neighbor "Azam", and as "Jizingooli" by her father's coworker "Agh Koochik" .

The show ran for a total of 30 episodes before its cancellation.
