= Sulekha Sanyal =

20th-century Indian writer

- Born: 15 June 1928; Korokdi, Faridpur, East Bengal, British India (now in Bangladesh)
- Died: 1962 (aged 33–34)
- Education: Rajendra College
- Known for: Nabankur

Sulekha Sanyal (15 June 1928 – c. 1962) was a Bengali writer and activist. She emerged as an early feminist in the region through her work Nabankur (The Seedling) in 1956. The work has been translated to English in 2001 by Gouranga P. Chattopadhyay.

== Early life and career ==
Sanyal grew up in Korokdi, now in Faridpur Bangladesh, in a decaying zamindar family that had once been indigo planters, and was to become a member of the Communist Party of India. An early influence on her was the Brahmo philosopher and reformer, Ramtanu Lahiri, who was related to her mother. Senyal passed the matriculation exam as a private candidate in 1944 and intermediate exam from Rajendra College, Faridpur, in 1946. She then went to Kolkata and enrolled herself in Victoria Institute.

Nabankur was published in English by Stree in 2001. Its heroine, Chhobi, is a young girl from a rural zamindar family in Bengal of the 1930s, and the book follows her as she learns to fight injustice, protest against the privileges denied her but granted to her brothers, and the restrictions of the patriarchal society around her. World War II breaks out, cutting short Chhobi's education in the city. She returns to the village, gets involved with relief work and witnesses the Bengal famine of 1943.

Much of the story mirrors Sanyal's own life, for she was born into a similar family, educated briefly in Chittagong, went for undergraduate studies at the Scottish Church College, where she became involved in politics during the Bengal Famine. On 21 January 1947, following a police assault, she was arrested along with her college friends Anjana Guha and Anima Ghosh, and that put an end to formal education. Late in life, she was awarded a degree in Bengali literature by the University of Burdwan.

Sanyal's first stories were accepted by the newspaper Jugantar. Sanyal also wrote a collection of short stories, Sindure Megh (Clouds Tinged with Red). Her Dewal Padma (Wallflowers) was published in 1964, after her death from leukemia in 1962.

== Personal life ==
Sanyal was married from 1948 to 1956. She had a sister Sujata Sanyal and an elder brother Abanti Kumar Sanyal.
