= Kamal Desai =

Indian novelist

Kamal Desai (10 November 1928 – 17 June 2011) was an Indian novelist writing in Marathi.

She was born in Yamkan Mardi in the Belgaum district. She studied in Belgaum, going on to complete a master's degree in Marathi at Bombay University. Desai began writing in 1955 and retired to Pune.

She is best known for her 1975 novel Hat Ghalnari Bai (Woman Wearing a Hat).

== Selected works ==
- Rang (Colours), stories (1962)
- Ratrandin Amha Yuddhacha Prasang (We confront the war day and night), novel (1963)
- Kala Surya (Dark sun), novel (1972)
- Rang-2, stories (1998)
