= V. Geetha =

Indian feminist activist

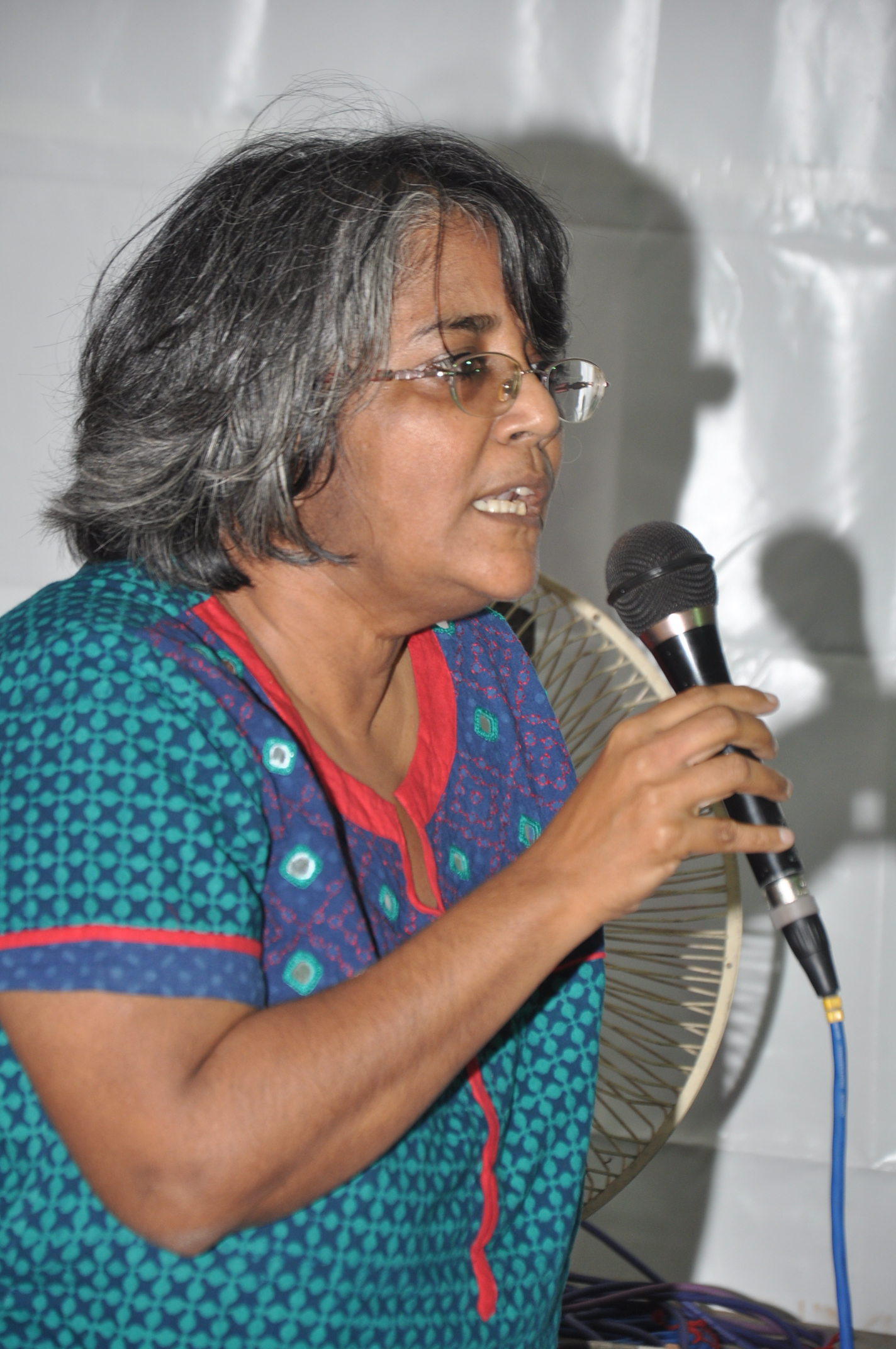
- Born: Tamil Nadu, India
- Occupations: Writer in Tamil and in English on history, culture and gender.
- Notable work: Undoing Impunity- Speech after sexual violence, Gender (Theorizing Feminism) and Towards a non-Brahmin Millennium.

V. Geetha is an Indian feminist activist who writes on issues related to caste, gender, education and civil rights. She operates from Madras (now known as Chennai) and has carried out research on the nature and proliferation of NGOs operating in Tamil Nadu. She has set up the federation of women's groups in the state and is also the editorial director at Tara Books. Other than this, she has translated two of Perumal Murugan's novels into English. Based on her research, she has observed that "Violence as an experience seemed to me to represent a point of intersection of trajectories of hurt, touch, love, fear, hunger and shame. It seemed to inhere as much in the grime of every day life, in habitual tone, gesture and touch, as it did in the particular and determined act of violence."

== Education ==
V. Geetha is a feminist activist, writer and historian from Chennai, Tamil Nadu. She studied at Madras Christian College and University of Iowa and was involved in political activism during her college days. Among various notable literary stalwarts, works by Shakespeare inspired her the most. 19th century fiction writers like George Eliot, Leo Tolstoy and Joseph Conrad has also influenced her intellectual understanding. Among Indian writers, she is fond of Medieval Vaishnavaite Bhakti Poetry and the modernists including A. Madavaihah and Subramania Bharati. Apart from this, Bangla writer Sabitri Ray, historian Sheila Rowbotham and critic Marina Warner are few among many women writers who have influenced her literary inclination. As far as her political ideology is concerned, teachings of Ambedkar, Periyar, Fanon and K.Balagopal has had an immense influence on her.

== Career ==
After completing her studies in 1988, she was active in the women's movement for over two decades, even as she worked at giving extramural lectures to women workers, activists and students. Working in the Indian women's movement, she and several others were instrumental in setting up an independent feminist initiative in Tamil Nadu - the Tamil Nadu Women's Coordination Committee (1990). Among other things, the Committee held state-level conferences of importance, including on Violence against Women (1992), on Women, Politics and Autonomy (1997), and Remembering Gujarat (2002). Geetha was also an active member of Snehidi, a women's group that worked with those who faced abuse in the family. This work was carried on for over 8 years and in association with the Tamil Nadu State Legal-Aid Board. Along with S. V. Rajadurai, she published a series of pioneering Tamil texts that introduced key western Marxist thinkers. Starting from 1991, Rajadurai and Geetha have published in Tamil and English on the Tamil Non-Brahmin movement, including the radical Self-respect movement of E V Ramasamy Periyar. She is now engaged in writing, teaching and research on subjects related to women. In 1998, she joined Tara books as an editorial director and has been associated with various kinds of art and literary projects on mythology and indigenous tribal and folk traditions since then.

== Notable publications ==
She has been consistently engaged in writing and translation work and has been actively contributing to various magazines and news portals. Some of her notable publications are: Translation of two novels of Perumal Murugan in Tamil into English; Towards a Non-Brahmin Millennium: from Iyothee Thass to Periyar co-authored with S.V. Rajadurai; Undoing Impunity- Speech after sexual violence; Religious Faith, Ideology, Citizenship: The View from Below co-authored with Nalini Rajan Kita in which several essays deal with varied topics of history and thoughts starting from the Gandhian era of civil disobedience during the British Raj, on freedom movement which involved suppression of freedom and resulted in humiliation of people, and on the Islamic dogmas of universal brotherhood. She has discussed issues of secularism as it has evolved in the 21st century in many parts of South East Asian region and when communal issues have dominated in India; and the book titled Fingerprint in which she has noted that fingerprinting has been opposed by people on the grounds that it violates fundamental rights of people as it tends to "foreclose their identities". Currently, she is engaged in researching the works of Dr. B.R. Ambedkar.

In Undoing Impunity- Speech after sexual violence, she unravels the idea of impunity with respect to sexual violence in South Asian context. She further highlights the idea of social recognition to describe how state not just misuses laws to disregard the victims of sexual violence but also denies their existence to further delineate them. The author argues that this can only be resolved through the collective effort from both the state as well as the citizens. Towards a non-Brahmin Millennium is another book co-authored by V. Geetha which revisits the various transformations of Dravidian movements and highlights the radical and social content embedded within the non-Brahminism. Keeping in mind the contemporary Dravidian politics, the authors also throw light on the relevance of non-Brahmin movements.
