= H. Emerson Blake =

American ecologist

H. Emerson Blake (also credited as Emerson Blake, or Chip Blake) is an ecologist, writer, and editor of many books. He was formerly the editor-in-chief at Orion Magazine, executive director of the Orion Society, and editor-in-chief at Milkweed Editions.

== Biography ==
Blake is originally from Philadelphia. He received his bachelor's degree from the University of Colorado at Boulder and finished his graduate work at Antioch University New England. While at Antioch, he helped found Whole Terrain, an environmentally-themed literary journal, and edited the first volume, Environmental Identity and Professional Choices (1992).

Though he studied ecology, Blake has been ensconced in the world of small publishing, editing, and nature writing. He was hired in 1992 at Orion Magazine as associate editor and continued as managing editor until 2003. When Milkweed Editions co-founder Emilie Buchwald retired in 2003, Blake took over as editor-in-chief of the small publishing company. In June 2005, Blake returned to take his current post as editor-in-chief of Orion Magazine and executive director of the Orion Society, moving on from Milkweed for personal reasons.

Books and essays he has edited have been nominated and won many awards including the National Magazine Award, the Pushcart Prize, the PEN Literary Award, the John Oakes Award in Environmental Journalism, the Minnesota Book Award, the Oregon Book Award, and The New York Times Notable Book of the Year. He has served as a judge for the Phil Reed Writing Award alongside Nikki Giovanni, Janisse Ray, Bill McKibben, Wilma Dykeman, and Jan DeBlieu.

He has served as a visiting faculty member at Sterling College in Craftsbury, Vermont.

Blake resides in Great Barrington, Massachusetts.
