= Whole Terrain =

- Co-Editors: Rochelle Gandour & Vivian Kimball
- Categories: Nature, culture, environment
- Frequency: Annual
- Publisher: Antioch University New England
- Founded: 1992
- Country: United States
- Based in: Keene, New Hampshire
- Language: English
- Website: wholeterrain.com
- ISSN: 1072-2513

Whole Terrain: Journal of Reflective Environmental Practice is an environmentally-themed literary journal that is published approximately once a year by Antioch University New England (ANE). Each volume explores emerging ecological and social issues from the perspectives of practitioners working in the environmental field. The editor position is open to current ANE students as a practicum experience.

== History and profile ==
Whole Terrain was founded in 1992 by the efforts of Antioch faculty and administration, including Mitchell Thomashow and Eleanor Falcon. The editor of Whole Terrain Volume 1: Environmental Identity and Professional Choices, was current Orion editor, H. Emerson Blake.

== Themes ==
- Heresy (Volume 20 2012/2013)
- Net Works (Volume 19 2011/2012)
- Boundaries (Volume 18 2010/2011)
- Significance of Scale (Volume 17 2009/2010)
- ((r)e)volution (Volume 16 2008/2009)
- Where is Nature? (Volume 15 2007/2008)
- Celebration and Ceremony (Volume 14 2005/2006)
- Risk (Volume 13 2004/2005)
- Resilience (Volume 12 2003/2004)
- Gratitude and Greed (Volume 11 2002/2003)
- Surplus and Scarcity (Volume 10 2001/2002)
- Serious Play (Volume 9 2000/2001)
- Legacy and Posterity (Volume 8 1999/2000)
- Transience, Permanence and Commitment (Volume 7 1998/1999)
- Creative Collaborations (Volume 6 1997/1998)
- Research as Real Work (Volume 5 1996/1997)
- Exploring Environmental Stereotypes (Volume 4 1995/1996)
- Environmental Ethics at Work (Volume 3 1994)
- Spirituality, Identity and Professional Choices (Volume 2 1993)
- Environmental Identity and Professional Choices (Volume 1 1992)

== Contributors ==
Contributors to Whole Terrain include:

- Rick Bass
- Thomas Berry
- Kenneth Boulding
- David Brower
- Steve Chase
- John Elder
- J Henry Fair
- Bernd Heinrich
- bell hooks
- Sabine Hrechdakian
- Lewis Hyde
- Stephanie Kaza
- Daniel Kemmis
- Robin Wall Kimmerer
- Michael Klare
- Patricia Monaghan
- Thomas Moore
- Gary Nabhan
- Howard Nelson
- Janisse Ray
- Pattiann Rogers
- Paul Slovic
- David Sobel
- John Tallmadge
- Tom Wessels
- Terry Tempest Williams

== See also ==
- Nature writing
