= Steve Chase =

American activist

Steve Chase is an American activist, organizer, Quaker, lecturer, and editor.

He was the director of the Advocacy for Social Justice and Sustainability program in the department of Environmental Studies at Antioch University New England.

== Biography ==
Steve Chase attended the Metropolitan State University in Minneapolis. He participated in a program of self-designed study, focusing on writing, publishing, social and ecological issues, and non-profit organizational management. Chase earned an MS in Environmental Studies came from Antioch University New England in May 1996. He became the Director of Antioch's Advocacy for Social Justice and Sustainability program (Formerly called the Environmental Advocacy And Organizing program), which he helped found, and used as the subject of his Ph.D. dissertation, in July 2002. The dissertation is titled Activist Training In The Academy: Developing a Master's Program in Environmental Advocacy and Organizing. Chase completed his Ph.D. at Antioch in November 2006.

In 2002–2003, The Robert and Patricia Switzer Foundation awarded Chase with the Switzer Environmental Leadership Grant, which covered his salary for the first year of the new program. In 2003-2004 Chase received the Ella Baker Fellowship to support and promote dialog between leaders in the business, academic, and non-profit arenas in the interest of positive social change.

Chase has taught courses in Organizing Social Movements and Campaigns; Corporate Power, Globalization, and Democracy; Organizational Leadership in the Nonprofit World; and Environmental Justice in the Mississippi Delta.

Steve Chase was the guest editor for Orion magazine's Autumn 1996 issue on the theme of Nature and Justice. He has been published in The Trumpeter, Whole Terrain, Z Magazine, Terra Nova, Race, Poverty, and Environment, Environment, Place, and Ethics, and The Journal of Multicultural Environmental Education. The Environmental Justice Reader: Politics, Poetics, & Pedagogy (University of Arizona Press, 2002 ISBN 0-8165-2207-3) included his essay Changing the Nature of Environmental Studies: Teaching Environmental Justice to 'Mainstream' Students.'

Chase is a member of the National Organizers Alliance, and United for a Fair Economy's National Trainers Network. He coordinates the Pacifica Radio Programming Committee at WKNH Radio in Keene and moderates a listserve for the annual National Training for Trainers in Human Rights Education. He has previously served on the editorial boards of Orion magazine, Terra Nova, South End Press, and More Than Money Journal. From 1985 to 1988, Chase worked as the business and marketing manager at Milkweed Editions. He has served on the boards of the Underground Railway Theater, and Bookslinger, Inc. He worked for the Green Party from 1984 to 1986, helped co-found Men Against Rape and Sexism (MARS) in 1980, and was a shop steward for the International Typographical Union, Local 9, in 1984.

== Books ==
- Chase, Steve, ed. Defending the Earth: A Dialogue Between Murray Bookchin and Dave Forman. (South End Press, 1990) ISBN 0-89608-383-7
- Chase, Steve. Letters to a Fellow Seeker. (Philadelphia, PA: QuakerPress of FGC, 2012) ISBN 1-937768-02-3
