= Jay Griffiths =

British author

- Born: Manchester, England
- Occupation: Writer
- Writing career
- Genres: Non-fiction, fiction
- Notable works: Wild: An Elemental Journey; Tristimania: A Diary of Manic Depression
- Website: jaygriffiths.com

Jay Griffiths (born in Manchester) is a British writer and author of Wild: An Elemental Journey, Pip Pip: A Sideways Look at Time, Anarchipelago, A Love Letter from a Stray Moon, Kith: The Riddle of the Childscape and Tristimania: A Diary of Manic Depression.

She won the Barnes & Noble Discover Award in 2002 for Pip Pip, the Orion Book Award in 2007 for Wild, and the Hay Festival's International Fellowship for 2015–2016.

== Biography ==
Jay Griffiths was born in Manchester, England, and now lives in Mid Wales. She studied English literature at Oxford University. Her work has appeared in the London Review of Books and she has contributed to programmes on BBC Radio 3, BBC Radio 4 and the World Service. Her columns have appeared in The Guardian, The Ecologist, Orion magazine and Aeon.

Griffiths said in a 2016 interview "The biggest single thing that inspires me is language." Her work is notable for its appeal to writers, attracting book-cover endorsements from John Berger, Philip Pullman, John Burnside, Robert Macfarlane, Bill McKibben, David Abram, Gary Snyder and Barry Lopez among others.

Griffiths has contributed to cultural events including the Adelaide Festival of Ideas, the More Than Us conference with David Abram and Scottish artists Dalziel + Scullion; the Royal Academy with artists Ackroyd & Harvey; the International Sacred Arts Festival in Delhi and has been a part of the popular Radiolab podcasts. She has also been a supporter of the Aluna project, for which she gave a talk in the Hayward Gallery in March 2007.

She was the Hay Festival International Fellow in 2016, has given talks at the Purcell Room and the National Portrait Gallery, London in conjunction with the Royal Society of Literature, and was part of the Free-Thinking Festival at the Sage Gateshead. She has appeared in conversation with John Berger at the British Library and her poetry is included in 'The Long White Thread of Words', an anthology for John Berger. Her first short story was anthologised in Best British Short Stories 2014, she has contributed to Dark Mountain and Towards Re-Enchantment: Place and its Meanings and wrote on birdsong for the anthology Arboreal, published by Little Toller.

== Works ==
=== Pip Pip: A Sideways Look at Time ===
Griffiths's first book was published by Flamingo in 1999. It explores time as a political subject, showing how indigenous cultures have diverse ways of considering time (past, present and future) but illustrating how one, single, European time is colonising all these varieties of time. It is a manifesto for cyclical time and for the times of nature, of carnival, of play: and argues that women's time is different from men's.

The book was a Book of the Year in The Independent and was described as "A wonderful, delightfully humorous polemic against everything that's wrong with the way we deal with time today". Iain Finlayson named it as his book of the year in The Times: "An irresistibly provocative and political analysis of time. Her wittily enthusiastic thesis is that time has too long been used as a tool to power: as a manifesto, it could cause a revolution." The New Scientist described it as "A whirl of a book. Any page will get you hooked" and The New Internationalist called it: “Splendid, extraordinarily wide-ranging, emphasizing the political import of the subject. Impressive, absorbing and radical, provocative, impassioned, often outrageously witty.” Peter Reading wrote in The Times Literary Supplement: "A thoughtful, original and intuitive account of how we perceive time which offers many alternative chronological considerations... amusing and erudite, fascinating and spirited. Bravo!"

=== Wild: An Elemental Journey ===
Wild is Griffiths's second book. It was published by Tarcher in the United States in 2006 and by Hamish Hamilton in the UK in 2007. (Note: In 2012 Cheryl Strayed published a book titled Wild: A Journey from Lost to Found in the United States, where Griffiths's book is now titled Savage Grace.)

The book describes an odyssey to wildernesses of earth, ice, water, air and fire, exploring the connection between human society and wild lands. It is also a journey into wild mind, as Griffiths explores the words and meanings which shape our ideas and experience of our own wildness, the wildness of the human spirit. The book includes the description of drinking ayahuasca with shamans in the Amazon, as a treatment for depression, and discusses shamanism, nomadism and freedom. Various chapters describe journeys to the Arctic, to Australia and to the freedom fighters of West Papua.

Wild is quoted on KT Tunstall's album Tiger Suit and has been nominated by Tunstall as her favourite book. The Strokes bassist Nikolai Fraiture reads from Wild during their documentary for their album Angles, and comments: "Jay Griffiths's works are original, inspiring and dare you to search beyond the accepted norm."

In April 2011, Radiohead guitarist Ed O'Brien posted a recommendation of Wild on the band's blog, stating that it is "an astonishing piece of writing " and that "it was exactly what I needed to read".

On publication in the UK, Wild was praised widely in major newspapers and described as ‘part travelogue, part call to arms and wholly original... A vital, unique and uncategorisable celebration of the spirit of life’. The Independent referred to it as 'remarkable' and 'stupendous' while The Guardian wrote: "Jay Griffiths is a five-star, card-carrying member of the hellfire club... a strange, utterly compelling book, Wild is easily the best, most rewarding travel book that I have read in the last decade." For The Sunday Times Anthony Sattin wrote "There is no getting away from the book's brilliance" and The Independent on Sunday referred to Wild "as a song of delight, and a cry of warning, poetic, erudite and insistent… a restless, unstintingly generous performance..." and The Times referred to "kaleidoscopic narrative", "exhilarating prose". Wild was successful in Australia where it received positive reviews in The Sydney Morning Herald, described by Bruce Elder as "The best book I read all year". During an interview about the experiences discussed in Wild, Griffiths said, "To my mind, at worst, the West operates a kind of 'intellectual apartheid' – the idea that our way of thinking is the only one. Really, there are more ways of living and thinking than we could ever imagine."

=== Anarchipelago ===
Griffiths' short novel Anarchipelago is set in the Newbury bypass protest camp in England in 1996. It was published by Wooden Books in 2007.

=== A Love Letter from a Stray Moon ===
A Love Letter from a Stray Moon was published by Text Publishing in Australia in 2011 and by Little Toller Books in the UK in 2014. It is a fictionalised portrait of the intense and prolific life of Frida Kahlo. Griffiths explores the artist's childhood polio, her devastating accident and her turbulent relationship with Diego Rivera, painting a vivid picture of passion, grief and transcendence. It is also a celebration of rebellion, from Kahlo's own politics to the Zapatistas, and a hymn to the revolutionary fire at the heart of art.

Jonathan Gibb in The Independent praised its 'driving, visionary, poetic prose" and the New Statesman called it "A poetic narrative that ripples with colour, acts of liberation and grief.' In Australia, where the book was first published, The Age called it "rich, honed and intense, a fierce, compelling homage," while The Sun-Herald called it "a multilayered work which creates a vivid sense of Kahlo's elliptical life" and Alice Nelson in The West Australian called it "A rapturous, crazy and gorgeous poem. It is a love song to life, to art and to the human spirit."

=== Kith: The Riddle of the Childscape ===
This book was published by Hamish Hamilton in 2013, and by Penguin in 2014. The US edition, published by Counterpoint, is titled A Country Called Childhood. Andrew Solomon in The New York Times described it as "Almost shockingly beautiful, a profoundly felt, deeply thought, fiercely argued examination of childhood... It is written in prose that is hardly prose, a poetry in paragraphs. Joanna Kavenna in Literary Review wrote "Kith is an extended paean to something that has been lost, and a bold protest against the forces that suppress and control. It is passionate, wilful and supremely honest. ... Jay Griffiths is fervent, scintillating and uninhibited. You emerge feeling you have heard someone speaking about her experience of the world, telling you what she thinks and not censoring herself. 'Children want what is authentic,' writes Griffiths. 'They loathe fake characters, forced laughs, false smiles and forged emotions.' I think adults do too, and the merged masses of adults and children need more books like this. While the review in The Guardian comments that Kith is at its centre "a lament for the English countryside and an expression of a very English Romanticism"; it describes the liking for Romanticism in the book as too easily descending into navel-gazing; objects to Griffiths' "reactionary ideology" to modern childhood; and argues that there is no real distinction between childscape and the domain of adults. The author Rebecca Loncraine, writing in The Independent, "didn't just read this book; I revelled in it." The reviewer finds the book's take on nature and the wild refreshing, and likes the energetic style which she agrees is a matter of taste; the book's structure is praised for being "carefully tangential", beautifully illustrating the ideas of freedom and unstructuredness that the book discusses. The reviewer finds the book "playful and polemical, emotional and imaginative. It's as vital as play itself."

=== Tristimania: A Diary of Manic Depression ===
Griffiths' 2016 book explores a year long episode of manic depression that she experienced. Stephanie Merritt in the Observer explains the title "For Griffiths, a profoundly poetic writer, her 'tristimania' (the 18th-century word she prefers to capture the precise combination of mania and melancholy in a mixed-state bipolar episode) is a condition steeped in metaphorical significance. 'Metaphor was becoming more true, if not more actual, than reality,' she writes. From this realm of symbolism she tries to convey both the terror and the seductive glitter of a manic episode. It was John Burnside's Book of the Year in the New Statesman, where he wrote: "Jay Griffiths is one of the most perceptive and lyrical writers working today; she also brings deep learning and immense moral courage to Tristimania: a Diary of Manic Depression (Hamish Hamilton), an elegant and inspiring study of a condition shared by many who feel obliged to conceal their pain. A triumph in every sense, this is a book that gives us all an uncompromised and hard-earned sense of hope. Also in the New Statesman Marina Benjamin wrote "Tristimania is an education in the history, mythology and poetics of madness, in all its wildness and glaring neon. Griffiths is a high-wire writer who performs the difficult trick of taking you into the depths of her madness while managing to remain a completely reliable guide. Griffiths's subtle point is that in madness we live inside metaphors that offer a parallel understanding of what is real that is no less valid than any other, only less tenable. Griffiths is an exciting and original thinker and her writing simply shimmers. This is self-exposure of a higher order." Horatio Clare in The Daily Telegraph wrote "Griffiths's ferocious, exploratory intellect makes her book shine... Her verses recall Sylvia Plath's 'Ariel', the best book on madness I knew before I'd read 'Tristimania'... Griffiths finds a delicate mode - funny, honest, iridescent with scholarship... rare lucidity and honesty make 'Tristimania' a gripping book, and an important one."

=== How Animals Heal Us ===
In 2025, Griffiths published How Animals Heal Us, a book on the history, folklore, and science of the healing effect of animals on people. Psychology Today described the book as "playful" and "a wonderful read".

== Awards ==
Pip Pip: A Sideways Look at Time won the Barnes & Noble Discover Award in 2002 for the best new non-fiction writer in the USA. "Jay Griffiths has produced nothing short of an original opening of the human mind… Her book is cleverness in the service of genius." (Citation on winning the Barnes and Noble "Discover" award). Wild won the inaugural Orion Book Award for 2007. Jay Griffiths was awarded the Hay Festival's International Fellowship for 2015–2016, an annual award made to a Wales-based writer at a significant juncture in their career. On 29 June 2025 Griffiths' life and work featured on BBC Radio 3's series Private Passions, relating her thought and work to relevant musical works.
