= Scott Vlaun =

American photographer and environmentalist

Scott Vlaun is an American photographer and environmentalist and a co-founder of Moose Pond Arts + Ecology and Center for an Ecology-Based Economy in Norway, Maine, where he was the executive director from 2013 through October 2025.

== Early life and education ==
Vlaun was born in 1958 in New London, Connecticut. Immediately after high school he attended Unity College for a semester to study Environmental Science. In 1984 he got his bachelor's degree from Portland School of Art and in 1997 obtained Master's from the University of New Mexico.

== Career ==
CEBE is a climate justice organization founded in 2013 that is dedicated to developing resilient local food systems, community-based renewable energy, public, electric, and human-powered transport, and affordable, efficient housing. Scott practices and teaches permaculture design in Maine and taught at the Maharishi University in Fairfield Iowa, as an adjunct faculty member in the Sustainable Living Department. He continues to write and photograph for publication.

His photographs have appeared in Mother Earth News articles and other publications that relate to agriculture, climate change and the planetary ecology. In 2024 he exhibited with other Maine-based photographers in Lights Out Gallery's 36 Windows Exhibit.
