= Tristimania =

2016 book by Jay Griffiths on her manic depression

Tristimania: A Diary of Manic Depression
- Cover of first edition
- Author: Jay Griffiths
- Subject: Insanity
- Genre: Non-fiction; Autobiography
- Publisher: Hamish Hamilton
- Publication date: 2016

Tristimania is a 2016 book by Jay Griffiths describing her experience of an episode of manic depression that lasted a year. In the book, she uses her training as a writer to make notes, and tells the story of the condition both from the inside and in terms of literary understanding: with etymology, metaphor, mythology, music, and poetry pressed into service to give the reader a picture of the events as she perceived them.

The book has been praised by critics for its bravery, and for its ability to connect personal experience to a shareable understanding.

== Context ==
Jay Griffiths is a British writer. She read English Literature at Oxford University. She has written for the London Review of Books and contributed to programmes on BBC Radio 3, BBC Radio 4 and the World Service. As a journalist, she has published columns in The Guardian, The Ecologist, Orion, and Aeon. Her non-fiction books include Pip Pip: A Sideways Look at Time (1999), Wild: An Elemental Journey (2006), and Kith: The Riddle of the Childscape (2013).

== Book ==
In the book, Griffiths explores both intellectually and subjectively a year-long episode of manic depression that she experienced, something that she found at once terrifying and attractive, based on the notes she kept at the time. The book consists of 181 pages of prose, followed, under the heading "Artist-Assassin", by 22 poems.

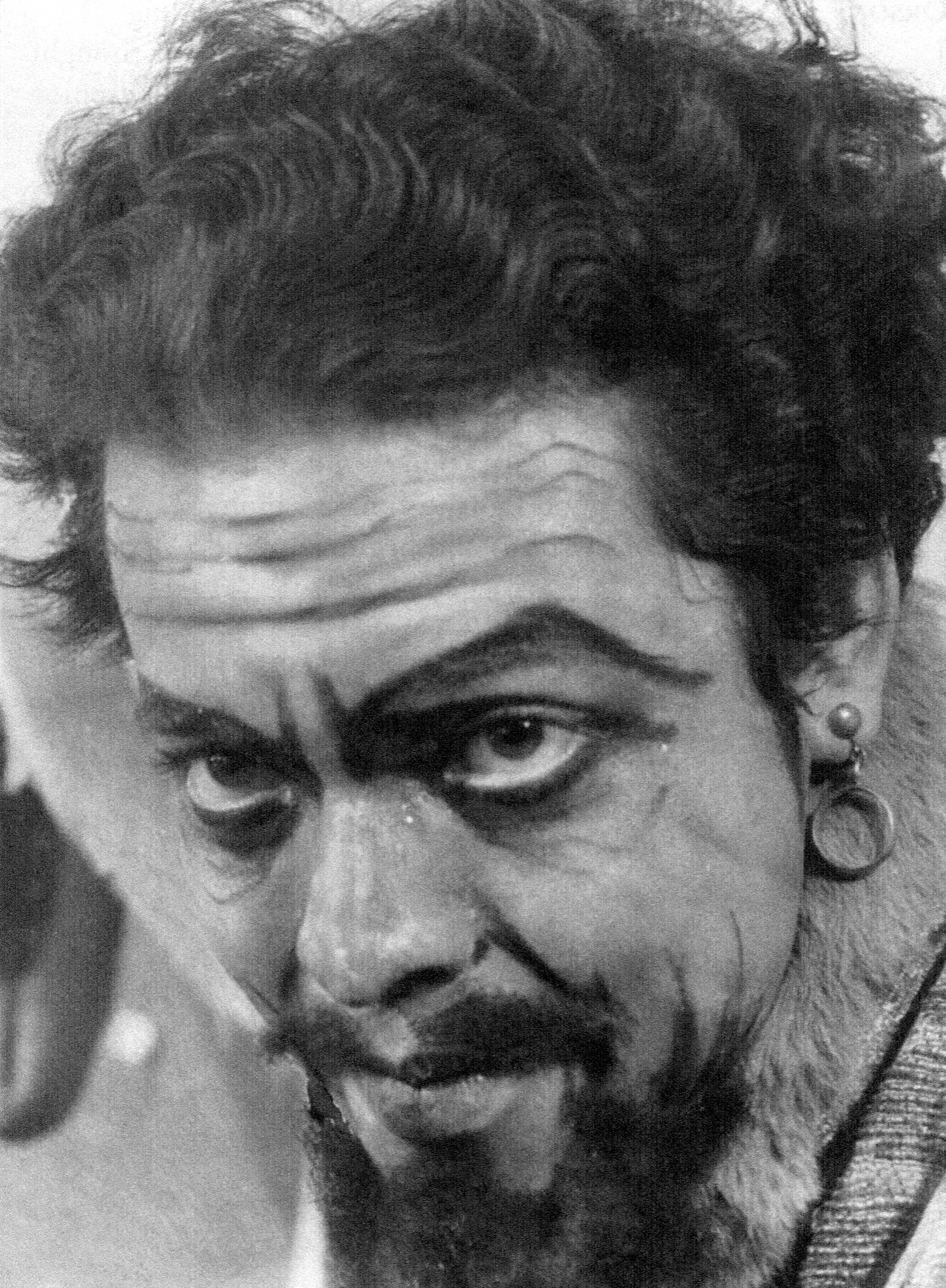
Griffiths discusses Mercutio (here played by Orson Welles in Guthrie McClintic's 1933 production of Romeo and Juliet), one of Shakespeare's Trickster characters, and their connection to manic depression.

She begins by telling how the episode began, injuring her ankle with the result that she was unable to go running, "seeking the self-medication of endorphins". Griffiths briefly enumerates the causes—genetic vulnerability (having a combination of genes that predispose to the condition); long-term stress; a trigger, in her case a "mild" sexual assault. She feels her mind "slip", noting the hand of Mercury, "god of writers and – surely – god of manic depression (that most mercurial of illnesses)". Griffiths describes going for medical treatment, realizing she is unable even to recall her telephone number, seeing the depths of her madness.

Griffiths then reflects on the reasons for writing such a book: "because manic depression seduces, like mountains do, and kills, as they do. Because, too, it is survivable with skilful help." She examines the words people have used for "this crazed state", describing the Old English wōd, meaning mad or frenzied, with older meanings of spiritual arousal, poet, connected to the Old English for song and the name Odin, "god of war and wisdom, shamanism and poetry." Griffiths describes the history of medical responses to the condition. She notes that hypomania and mania can appear as hyperacusis, sharply increased awareness "certainly an aspect of artistic sensitivity", and compares the experience to flight—followed by "payback time". Griffiths tells how she felt, using metaphors, anecdotes, descriptive passages, narrative of how her doctor patiently helped her: "He listened, deeply." She writes of how she "wanted to breathe in the inspired air of Bach ... Music, neutralizing the power of the siren song".

She examines the mythical figures associated with the condition, starting with Mercury-Hermes, "one of the Trickster gods" and "the only shaman in the pantheon", "dynamic, quixotic, enigmatic". She mentions other Trickster figures: Puck, Coyote, Zorba, Raven, Thoth, and Shakespeare's characters Mercutio and Autolycus. Griffiths notes that many of Shakespeare's characters, too, have mania, depression, or both: Antonio, Jaques, Hamlet, Lear, Timon, Cleopatra; and wonders if he experienced it himself.

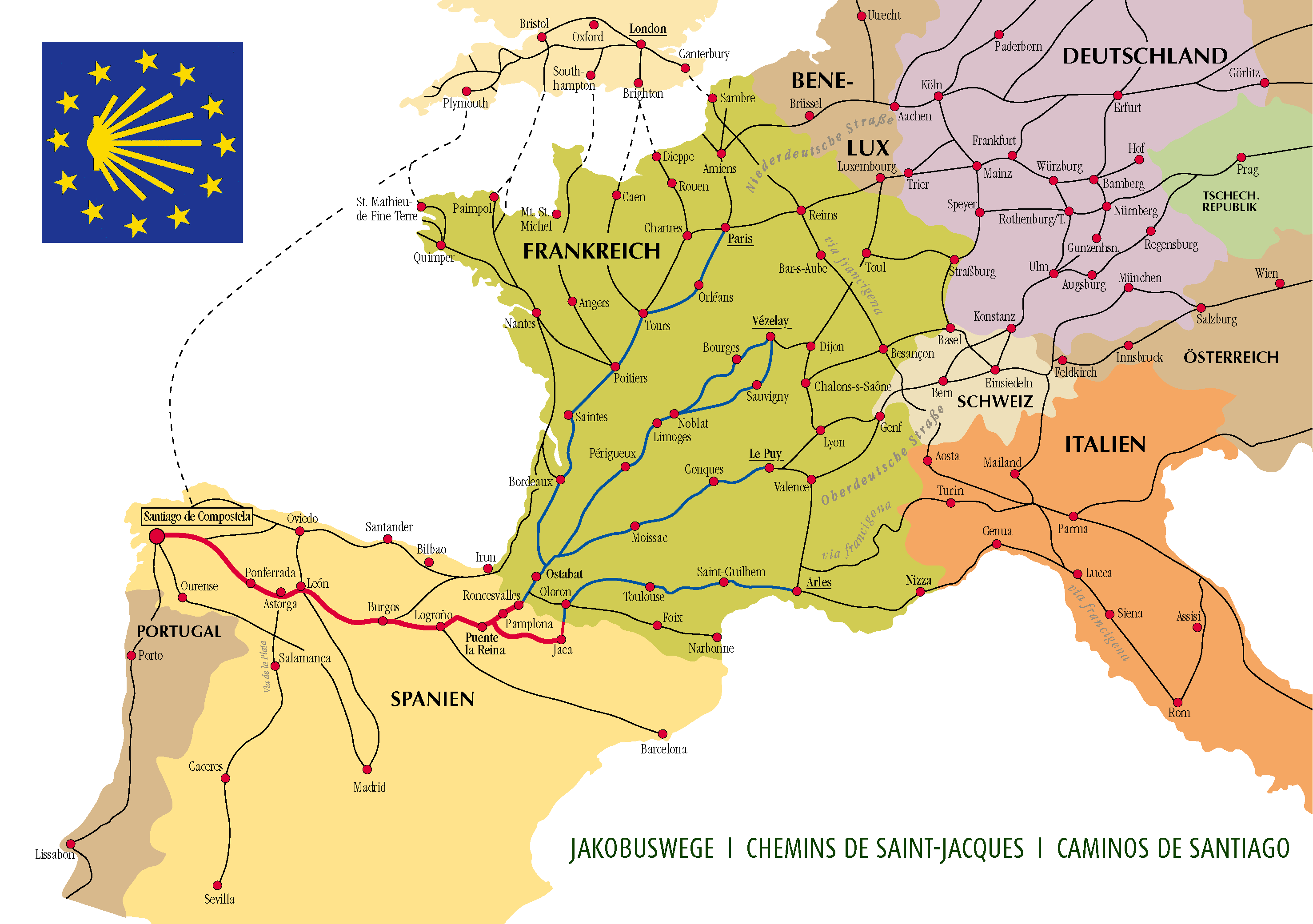
Griffiths walked the Camino de Santiago (thick red line) across Spain in an attempt to cure herself.

Griffiths tells, too, how "in the dark days of January ... I became feverish to write the poetry of this madness." She feels she is bargaining with Mercury: keep the dose of antipsychotics low and "I'll give you poems." She examines the relationship between poetry and madness: both cure and risk. She looks at the madness of poets, from Orpheus to Gérard de Nerval, Keats, Gerard Manley Hopkins, John Clare, Kit Smart, Coleridge, and narrates her brush with suicide, the help of her friends, and seeing people's 'wings'.

In the final part, Griffiths narrates walking the Camino de Santiago, the pilgrimage route across Spain, as a way "to walk away" from her madness. She is unfit from being ill, and decides to come off her medication, to the horror of her friends. The walk is a struggle; on the second or third day, she collapses on the path. Griffiths is "lonely but always surrounded by people: it was the worst of both worlds." She weeps at the reception desk in a hostel. "I've been very ill, I said. Very up and down? she asked. It must have been written all over my face." As she is wished "Buen Camino" (lit. "Good Path", i.e. "Safe Journey!"), she notes that the Camino is "both footpath and metaphor for one's life." Griffiths comes home, and "In homecoming, my body, too, was happy."

== Reception ==
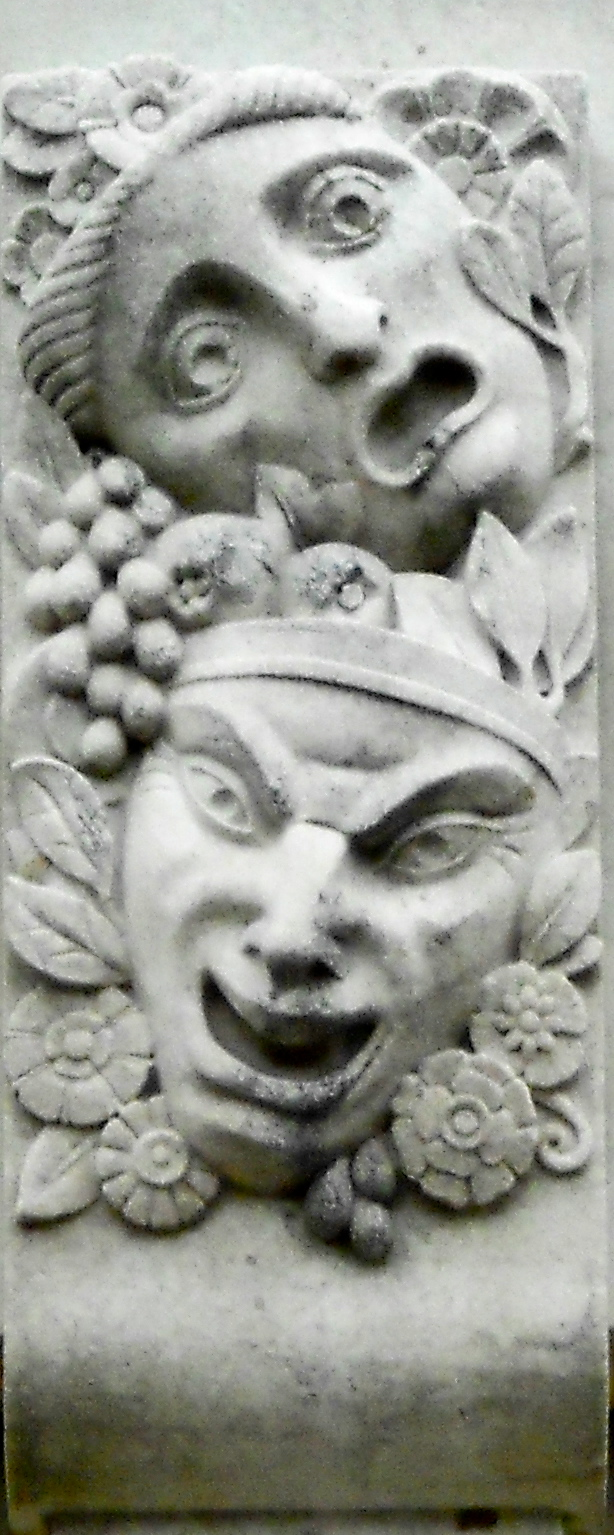
In bipolar disorder, mood switches between mania and melancholy.

In the Observer, Stephanie Merritt describes Tristimania as "a glimpse of madness from inside the eye of the storm." She explains the book's title as "the 18th-century word she prefers to capture the precise combination of mania and melancholy in a mixed-state bipolar episode ... a condition steeped in metaphorical significance." She quotes Griffiths: "Metaphor was becoming more true, if not more actual, than reality".

Kirkus Reviews called the book "A visceral account of the turmoil experienced within a manic-depressive breakdown." The reviewer observed that Griffiths used her notebooks, "very precious to me ... footprints of my thoughts, tracks of journeys, curiosity-paths and desire-lines", to make sense of her experience.

In the New Statesman, John Burnside made it his Book of the Year, writing: "Jay Griffiths is one of the most perceptive and lyrical writers working today; she also brings deep learning and immense moral courage to [her book], an elegant and inspiring study of a condition shared by many who feel obliged to conceal their pain. A triumph in every sense, this is a book that gives us all an uncompromised and hard-earned sense of hope.

Also in the New Statesman, Marina Benjamin notes that Griffiths' anchors are literary: Shakespeare, Christopher Smart, Samuel Beckett. She praises Griffiths for the "difficult trick of taking you into the depths of her madness ("I could feel my mind on a slant, every day more off-kilter, every night sleeping less") while managing to remain a completely reliable guide." She writes that "Tristimania is an education in the history, mythology and poetics of madness, in all its wildness and glaring neon. Griffiths is a high-wire writer who performs the difficult trick of taking you into the depths of her madness while managing to remain a completely reliable guide. Griffiths's subtle point is that in madness we live inside metaphors that offer a parallel understanding of what is real that is no less valid than any other, only less tenable. Griffiths is an exciting and original thinker and her writing simply shimmers. ... This is self-exposure of a higher order."

In the Daily Telegraph, Horatio Clare wrote that "Griffiths's ferocious, exploratory intellect makes her book shine... Her verses recall Sylvia Plath's Ariel, the best book on madness I knew before I'd read Tristimania... Griffiths finds a delicate mode - funny, honest, iridescent with scholarship... rare lucidity and honesty make Tristimania a gripping book, and an important one."

== Sources ==
- Griffiths, Jay (2017). Tristimania (Paperback ed.). Penguin. ISBN 978-0-241-97204-5.
