= Kathryn Miles =

American journalist, writer, and environmental theorist

- Born: 1974 (age 51–52); Peoria, Illinois
- Education: Saint Louis University
- Writing career
- Genre: non-fiction

Kathryn Miles (Born Peoria, Illinois in 1974) is an American journalist, writer, and environmental theorist. She is the author of five books including "Trailed: One Woman's Quest to Solve the Shenandoah Murders,", which was named a "best book" of the year by the New York Times.

== Background ==
Miles grew up in the Midwest of the United States and worked as a cub reporter for Journal Star in Peoria, Illinois. She attended college at Saint Louis University. Miles originally enrolled as a pre-law student but soon switched to Philosophy and English. She received a PhD in literary theory but said that "criticism didn't quite fit right either," and so she returned to journalism, her first love.

== Academic career ==
Miles served as professor of Environmental Writing at Unity College from 2001-2013. She has worked as writer-in-residence for Green Mountain College in Poultney, Vermont.. She is currently on the faculty of the Chatham University MFA program.

== Writer ==
Kathryn Miles sold her first book, Adventures with Ari, to Skyhorse Publishing. It was named a "notable book" by Bark Magazine. Her second book, All Standing: The Remarkable Story of the Jeanie Johnston, The Legendary Irish Famine Ship was published by Simon & Schuster in 2013. The book chronicles the story of the Jeanie Johnston, which Miles called "the world's luckiest ship" in an interview on NPR. In 2014 she wrote Superstorm: Nine Days Inside Hurricane Sandy, which was "the first complete moment-by-moment account of the largest Atlantic storm on record". Miles' essays and articles have appeared in publications including The Best American Essays, History, Outside, Popular Mechanics and Terrain.org. Her investigation into the sinking of the Bounty, which first appeared in Outside, was named one of the best long reads of 2013 by the Daily Beast and a "notable narrative" by Harvard University's Nieman Journalism Foundation. Her fourth book is Quakeland: On the Road to America's Next Devastating Earthquake, a study of the history and future potential of earthquakes in America.

== Bibliography ==
- Trailed: One Woman's Quest to Solve the Shenandoah Murders, Algonquin Books, 2022 ISBN 9781616209094
- Quakeland: On the Road to America's Next Devastating Earthquake, Dutton, 2017. ISBN 9780525955184, OCLC 986788446
- Superstorm: Nine Days Inside Hurricane Sandy, Dutton, 2014. ISBN 9780525954408, OCLC 937061745
- All Standing: The Remarkable Story of the Jeanie Johnston, the Legendary Irish Famine Ship, Simon & Schuster, 2013. ISBN 9781451610154, OCLC 830352071
- Adventures with Ari, Skyhorse, 2009. ISBN 9781602396388, OCLC 277202865
- Dog is Our Co-Pilot (2009).
