= Wild: An Elemental Journey =

Travel book

- Cover of 1st edition
- Author: Jay Griffiths
- Language: English
- Genre: Travel literature
- Publisher: Tarcher
- Publication date: 2006
- Publication place: United Kingdom
- Pages: 374 in 1st edition
- ISBN: 978-1585424030

Wild: An Elemental Journey is a 2006 travel book by the British writer Jay Griffiths. In it, she describes her travels to the Amazon rainforest, Canadian Arctic, Australian outback, Western New Guinea and Sulawesi, and her experiences in nature and interactions with Indigenous peoples. It received positive reviews.

== Context ==
Jay Griffiths is a British writer. She read English Literature at Oxford University. She has written for the London Review of Books and contributed to programmes on BBC Radio 3, BBC Radio 4 and the World Service. As a journalist, she has published columns in The Guardian, The Ecologist, Orion, and Aeon. Her non-fiction books include Pip Pip: A Sideways Look at Time (1999), Kith: The Riddle of the Childscape (2013), and Tristimania (2016).

== Book ==
=== Publication history ===
Wild was published by Tarcher in the United States in 2006 and by Hamish Hamilton in the UK in 2007. (Note: In 2012 Cheryl Strayed published a book titled Wild: A Journey from Lost to Found in the United States, where the book has been retitled Savage Grace.) Penguin Books issued a paperback version in 2008. It was published in Korean in 2011.

=== Synopsis ===
Wild describes a seven-year odyssey to wildernesses representing the five traditional elements of earth, ice, water, air and fire, the connection between human society and wild lands. Earth is the Amazon rainforest; ice is the Canadian Arctic; visting Bajo communities in Sulawesi, is water; the Australian outback is fire; and West Papua's montane forests represent air.

It is also an intellectual travel, a journey into wild mind, as Griffiths explores the words and meanings which shape people's ideas and experience of wildness, the wildness of the human spirit. The book includes the description of drinking ayahuasca with shamans in the Amazon, as a treatment for depression, and discusses shamanism, nomadism and freedom. Chapters describe journeys to the Arctic, to Australia and to the freedom fighters of West Papua.

== Reception ==
On publication in the UK, Wild was praised widely in major newspapers; it was described as "part travelogue, part call to arms and wholly original... A vital, unique and uncategorisable celebration of the spirit of life". The Independent called it "remarkable" and "stupendous" while Mark Cocker of The Guardian wrote: "Jay Griffiths is a five-star, card-carrying member of the hellfire club... a strange, utterly compelling book, Wild is easily the best, most rewarding travel book that I have read in the last decade." In The Sunday Times, Anthony Sattin wrote "There is no getting away from the book's brilliance". The Independent on Sunday described Wild "as a song of delight, and a cry of warning, poetic, erudite and insistent… a restless, unstintingly generous performance..." The wildlife author Richard Mabey in The Times wrote of its "kaleidoscopic narrative" and "exhilarating prose". In the Sydney Morning Herald, Bruce Elder describe Wild as "The best book I read all year".

During an interview about the experiences she described in Wild, Griffiths said, "To my mind, at worst, the West operates a kind of 'intellectual apartheid' – the idea that our way of thinking is the only one. Really, there are more ways of living and thinking than we could ever imagine."

Wild is quoted on KT Tunstall's album Tiger Suit; she called it her favourite book. The Strokes bassist Nikolai Fraiture reads from Wild during their documentary for their album Angles, and comments: "Jay Griffiths's works are original, inspiring and dare you to search beyond the accepted norm." Radiohead guitarist Ed O'Brien posted a recommendation of Wild on the band's blog, stating that it was "an astonishing piece of writing " and that "it was exactly what I needed to read".
