= Mitchell Thomashow =

American writer, educator, and environmentalist

Mitchell S. Thomashow

9th President of Unity Environmental University
- In office 2006–2011
- Preceded by: David Glenn-Lewin
- Succeeded by: Stephen Mulkey

Personal details
- Education: New York University (BA); Stony Brook University (MA)

Mitchell S. Thomashow is a writer, educator, and environmentalist focused on innovations in sustainability and environmental learning.

Thomashow is the author of essays in environmental and education anthologies, including as co-founder of Whole Terrain: The Journal of Reflective Environmentalism and Hawk and Handsaw: The Journal of Creative Sustainability.

Thomashow was the chair of the Environmental Studies program at Antioch University from 1976 to 2006 and the president of Unity College in Maine from 2006 to 2011. From 2011 to 2015, he was the director of the Presidential Fellows Program at Second Nature, a US-based organization that works with post-secondary institutions on sustainability teaching.

From 2011 to 2018, Thomashow consulted with colleges and universities on both sustainability and environmental studies curricula and programs. He has held fellowships at Second Nature in Boston and Philanthropy Northwest in Seattle.

== Works ==
- Ecological Identity: Becoming a Reflective Environmentalist (1996): Based on his experiences teaching at Antioch New England Graduate School, Thomashow explores how an affiliation with environmental concepts changes the way a person thinks about citizenship, faith, agency, and education.
- Bringing the Biosphere Home: Learning to Perceive Global Environmental Change (2003): Thomashow suggests that place-based natural history is a foundation for broadening spatial and temporal understanding of environmental change, and covers some of the existential challenges of species extinction and climate change. Thomashow also explores the relationship between the local and the global, and suggests ways for a person to develop fidelity to place in a world of transience.
- The Nine Elements of a Sustainable Campus (2014): Provides campus-wide strategies for implementing organizational change, using sustainability as a foundation; the nine elements are energy, food, materials, governance, investment, wellness, curriculum, interpretation, and aesthetics.
- Pacific Northwest Changemakers (2017): Profiles of eight exemplary, community-based sustainability projects that emphasize social justice.
- To Know the World (2020): A new vision for environmental learning.
