= David C. Webster =

American politician

David Webster

Member of the Maine House of Representatives for District 106
- In office 2004–2012

Personal details
- Born: 1947 or 1948 (age 78–79)
- Party: Democratic
- Education: Antioch University New England (Bachelor's), Empire State College

David C. Webster (born 1947 or 1948) is an American politician. He was a member of the Maine House of Representatives from 2006 to 2012. He works as a construction consultant outside of politics, as well as an Adjunct Faculty Member of Husson College. He supported tax cuts and government spending control during his time in the legislature.
