= Pre-Columbian woodlands of North America =

Mixed woodland-grassland ecosystem

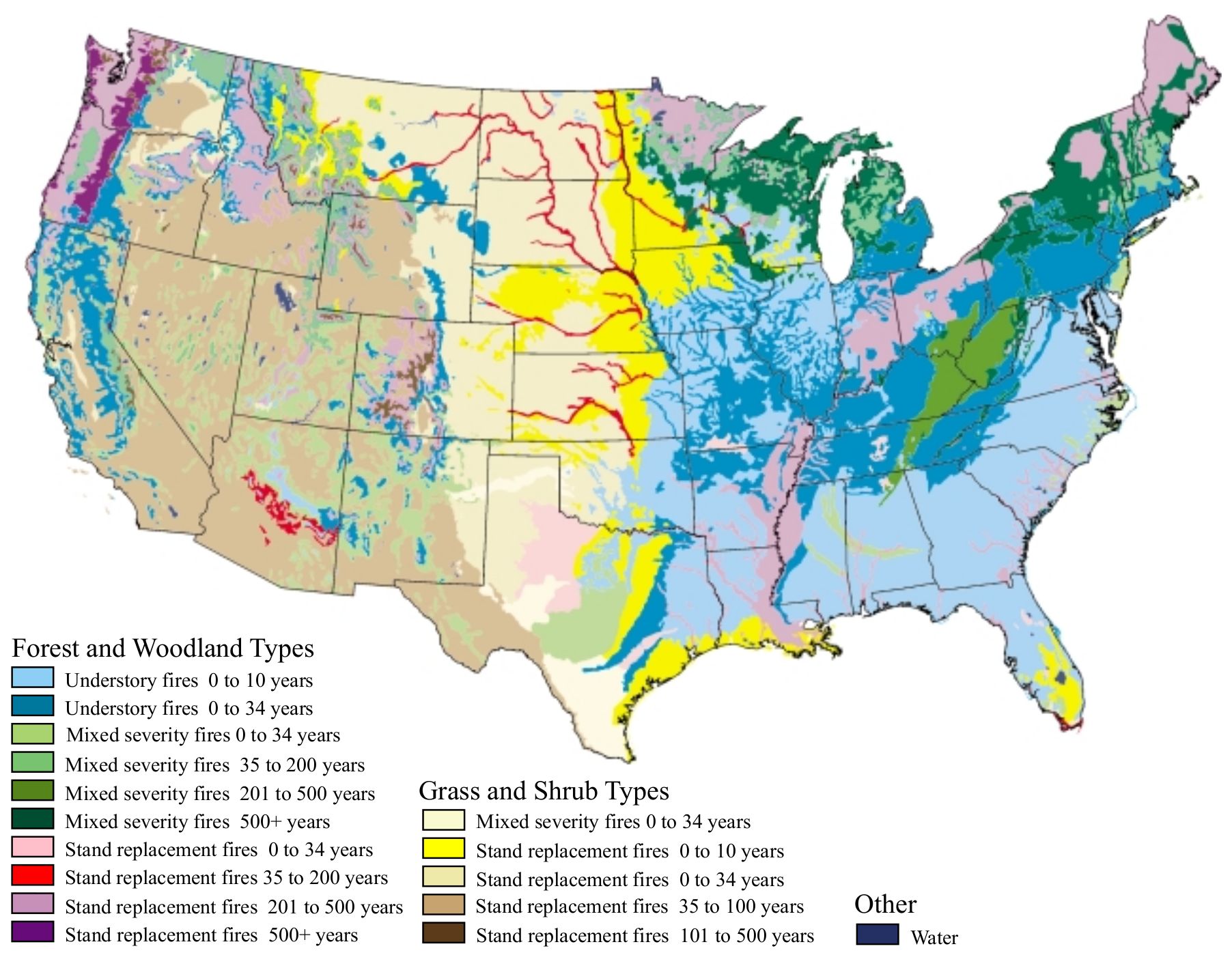
Hypothesized fire regimes of natural communities in the United States. Grassy woodlands have regimes of a few years: blue, pink, and light green areas.

Pre-Columbian woodlands of North America, consisting of a mixed woodland-grassland ecosystem, were maintained by both natural lightning fires and by Native Americans before the significant arrival of Europeans. Although decimated by widespread epidemic disease, Native Americans in the 16th century continued using fire to clear woodlands until European colonists began colonizing the eastern seaboard. Many colonists continued the practice of burning to clear underbrush, reinforced by their similar experience in Europe, but some land reverted to forest.

== Postglacial events ==
During the Last Glacial Maximum about 18,000 years ago, the glacial front in the eastern United States extended south to the approximate location of the Missouri and Ohio River. These glaciers destroyed any vegetation in their path, and cooled the climate near their front. Pre-existing natural communities remained largely intact south of the glaciers, but saw an increase in dominance of pine and a now-extinct species of temperate spruce, (Picea critchfieldii). This area included many plant communities that rely on a lightning-based fire regime, such as the longleaf pine woodland. When the glaciers began to retreat, the ancient natural communities of the southeast would be the primary source of colonization for the newly exposed areas in the midwest.

Warming and drying during the Holocene climatic optimum began about 9,000 years ago and affected the vegetation of the southeast. The prairies and grassy woodlands of the southeast expanded their range, and xeric oak and oak-hickory forest types proliferated. Cooler-climate species migrated northward and upward in elevation. This retreat caused a proportional increase in pine-dominated forests in the Appalachians. At about 4,000 years BP, the Archaic Indian cultures began practising agriculture. Technology had advanced to the point that pottery was becoming common, and the small-scale felling of trees became feasible. Concurrently, the Archaic Indians began using fire in a widespread manner. Intentional burning of vegetation was taken up to mimic the effects of natural fires that tended to clear forest understories, thereby making travel easier and facilitating the growth of herbs and berry-producing plants that were important for both food and medicines. In some areas, the effects of Native Americans fires would mimic natural lightning regimes, while in others they would significantly alter the natural communities.

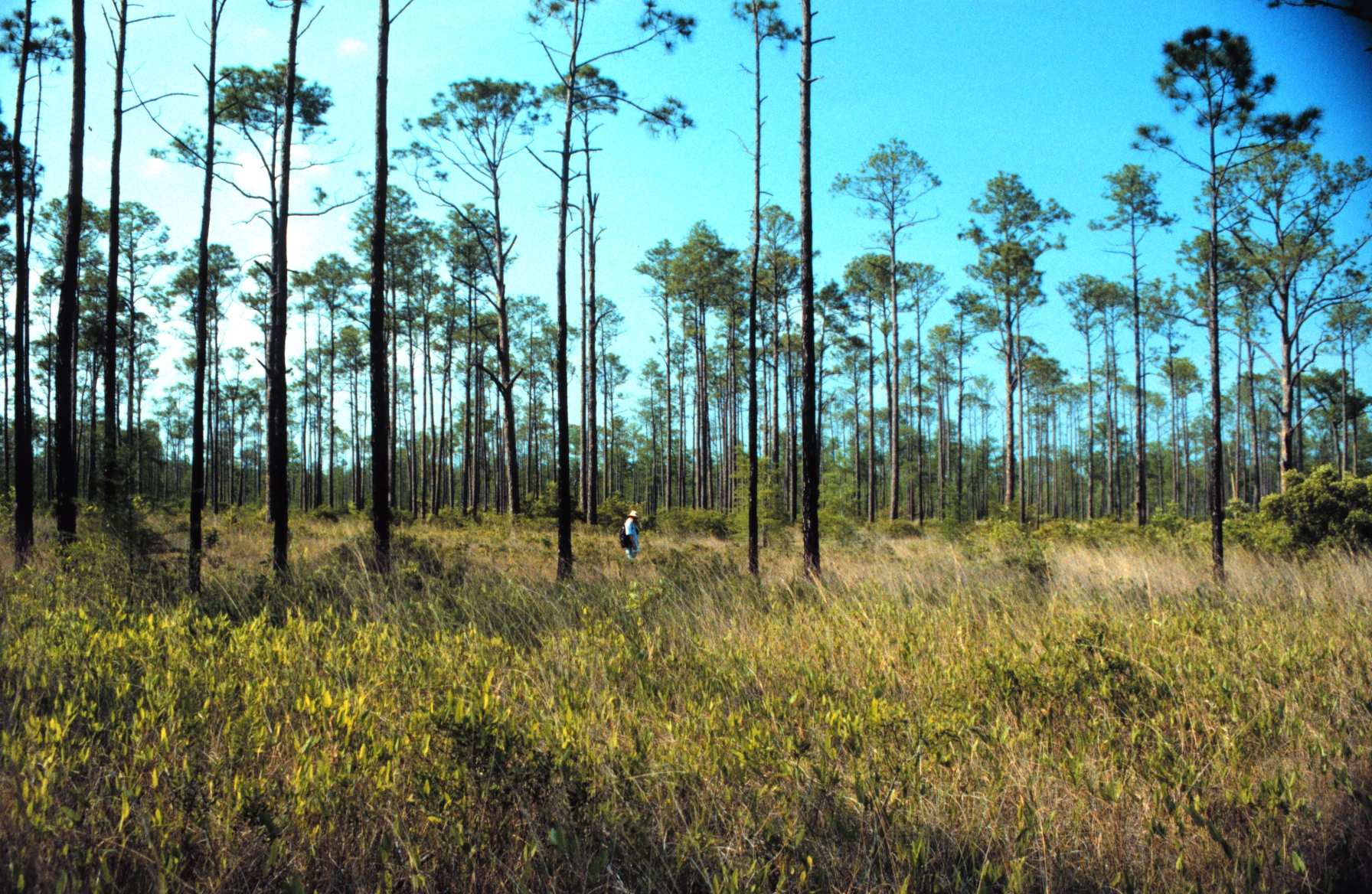
Maritime slash pine savanna

From the 16th century on, the massive depopulation of Native Americans caused by the arrival of European settlers meant an end to burning and farming across large areas.

... by the time the first European observers were reporting the nature of the vegetation of the region, it is likely to have changed significantly since the regional peak of Indian influence. A myth has developed that prior to European culture the New World was a pristine wilderness. In fact, the vegetation conditions that the European settlers observed were changing rapidly because of aboriginal depopulation. As a result, canopy closure and forest tree density were increasing throughout the region.

== Historic or remaining woodland areas ==
Grassy woodlands surrounded much of the continent's central tallgrass prairie and shortgrass prairie. Fire also swept the Rocky Mountains aspen as frequently as every ten years, creating large areas of parkland. In the far southwest was California oak woodland and Ponderosa Pine savanna, while further north was the Oregon White Oak savanna. The Central Hardwood Region covers a wide belt from northern Minnesota and Wisconsin, down through Iowa, Illinois, northern and central Missouri, eastern Kansas, and central Oklahoma to north-central Texas, with isolated pockets further east around the Great Lakes. The Eastern woodlands of the United States extended further east to the Atlantic seaboard.

In the southeast, longleaf pine dominated the grassy woodlands and open-floored forests which once covered 92,000,000 acres (370,000 km^{2}) from Virginia to Texas. These covered 36% of the region's land and 52% of the upland areas. Of this, less than 1% of the unaltered forest still stands.

In the Eastern Deciduous Forest, frequent fires kept open areas that supported herds of bison. Agricultural Native Americans extensively burned a substantial portion of this forest. Annual burning created many large oaks and white pines with little understory.

The Southeastern Pine Region, from Texas to Virginia, is characterized by longleaf, slash, loblolly, shortleaf, and sand pines. Lightning and humans burned the understory of longleaf pine every 1 to 15 years from Archaic periods until widespread fire suppression practices were adopted in the 1930s. Burning to manage wildlife habitat did continue and was a common practice by 1950. Longleaf pine dominated the coastal plains until the early 1900s, where loblolly and slash pines now dominate.

At low altitudes in the Rocky Mountain region, large areas of Ponderosa pine and Douglas fir had an open park-like structure until the 1900s. In California's Sierra Nevada area, frequent fires kept clear the understory of stands of both Ponderosa pines and giant Sequoia.

== Destruction of the woodlands ==
Industrialized sawmills in the early 20th century cleared many tall woodland old-growth trees, while fire suppression methods adopted in the 1930s and 1940s stopped much of the regular burning which the woodland required. By the latter half of the 20th century, many researchers had rediscovered both the prehistoric use of fire and methods to practice burning, but by then almost all prairie and grassy woodlands had been converted to agriculture or succeeded to full-canopy forest. Modern conservation of the grassy woodland includes controlled burning, and at present about 6,000,000 acres (24,000 km^{2}) a year are burned.

== See also ==
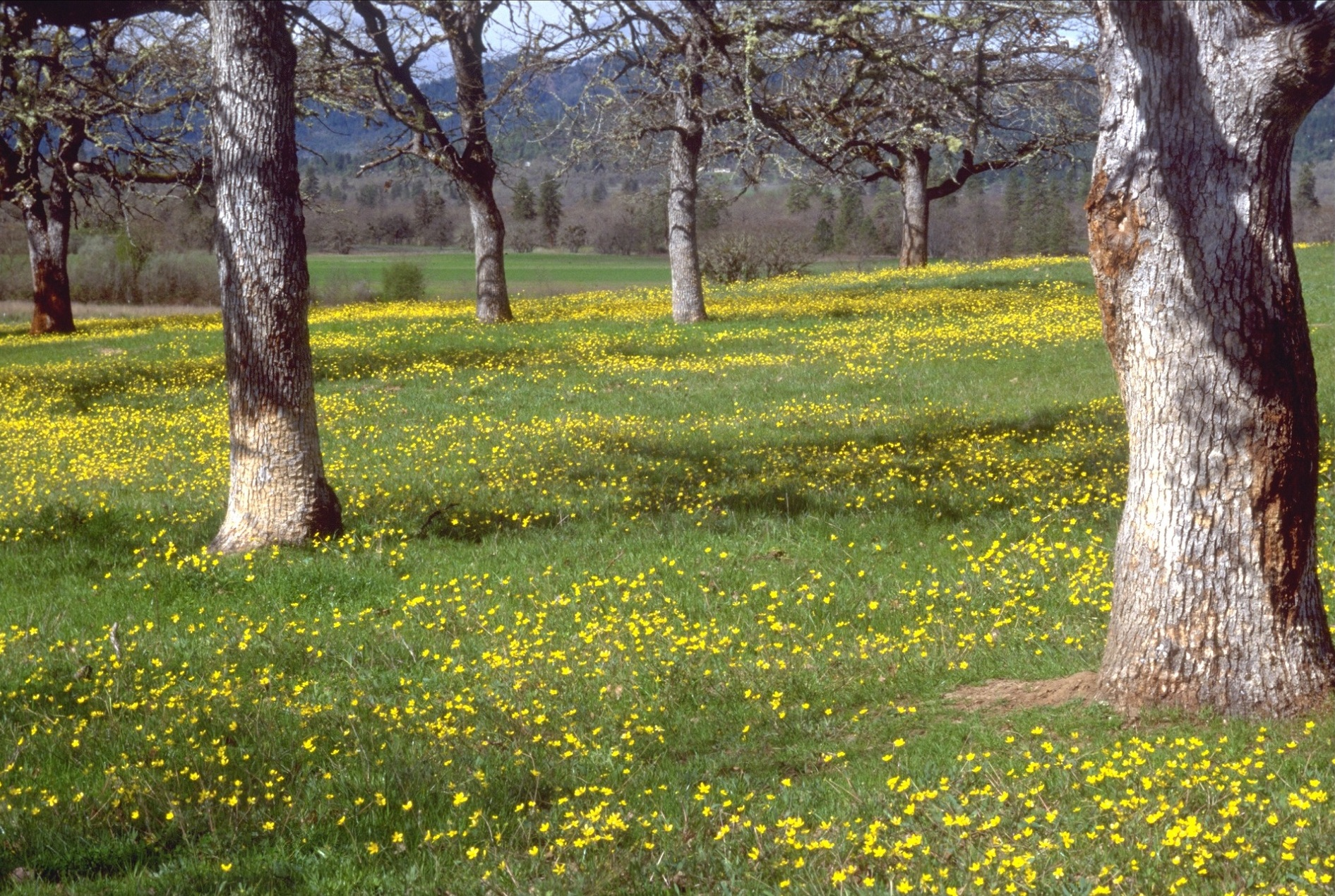
Oak savanna with buttercups in Sams Valley, Oregon

- Eastern woodlands of the United States
- Oak savanna – on the west coast and in western and central regions
- Native American use of fire
- Terra preta – use of burning in South America agricultural use rather than grassland
- Prairie remnant – pre-Columbian fire-dependent habitats of North America
