= Janisse Ray =

American writer, naturalist, and environmental activist

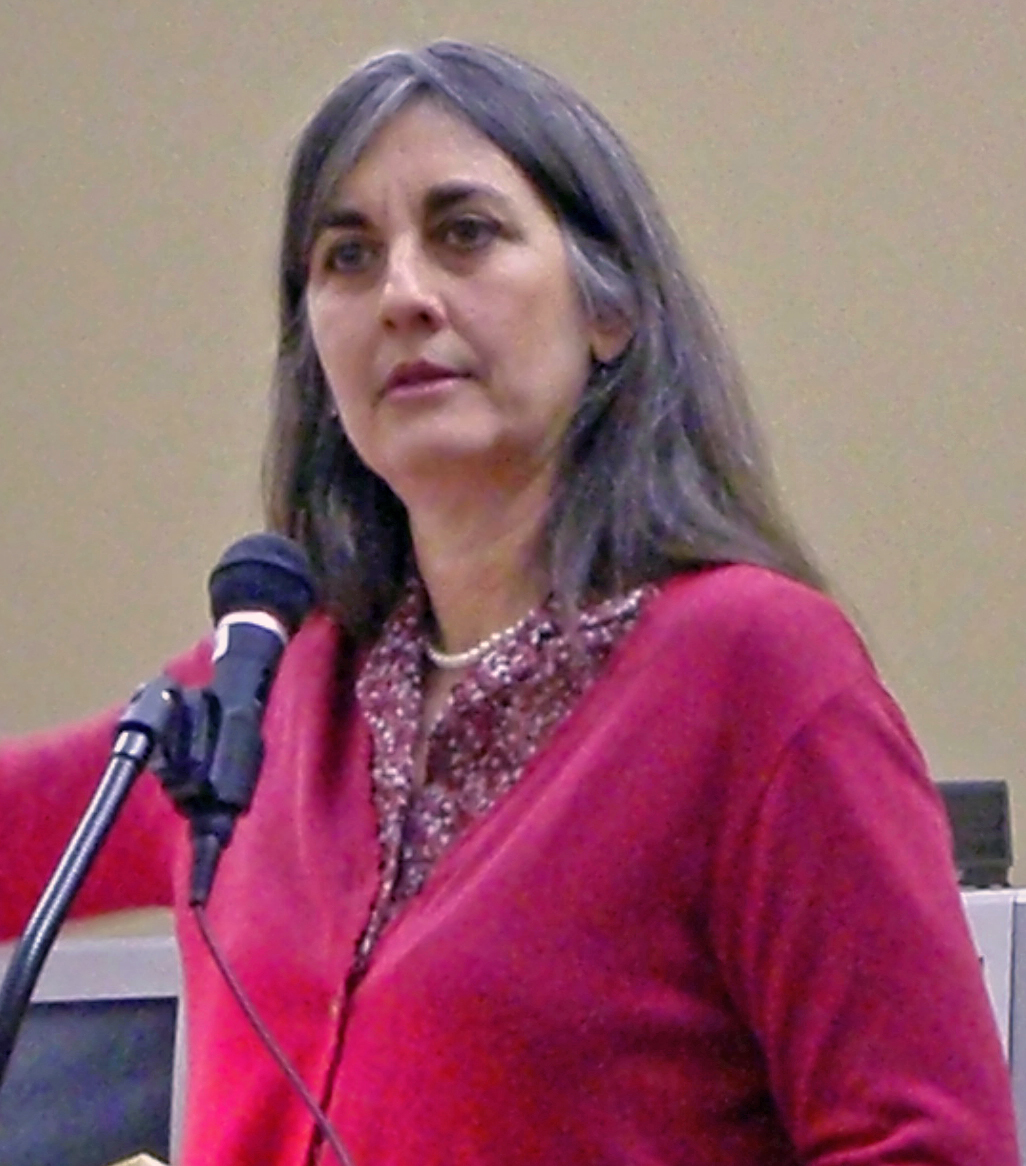
- Janisse Ray speaking at East Georgia State College in 2012.
- Born: February 2, 1962 (age 64); Baxley GA, US
- Education: BA, Florida State, 1984; MFA, Montana, 1997
- Occupations: Professor, environmental activist
- Spouse: Raven Waters
- Children: Skye
- Writing career
- Language: English
- Period: Contemporary
- Genre: Memoirs
- Subjects: Nature, conservation, the American South
- Notable work: Ecology of a Cracker Childhood
- Notable awards: American Book Award, Southern Book Critics Circle Award, Southern Environmental Law Center Award for Outstanding Writing on the Southern Environment

Janisse Ray (born February 2, 1962) is an American writer, naturalist, and environmental activist.

== Early life and education ==
Ray was born Baxley, Georgia to Franklin D. and Lee Ada Branch Ray. Ray’s ancestors were listed in the first census in Appling county in 1820 and the town of Baxley was named for an ancestor as well. From 1980 to 1982, she attended North Georgia College where she found her passion for ecology, which led her to her career. She received a Bachelor of Arts from Florida State University and a Master of Fine Arts from the University of Montana.

== Career ==
Ecology of a Cracker Childhood (1999) recounts Ray's experiences growing up in a junkyard, the daughter of a poor, white, fundamentalist Christian family. In the book she surveys the ecological web she experienced as a child; including plant species (Longleaf Pine, Cypress Swamp, Wiregrass, Meadow Beauty, Liatris, Greeneyes) and animal species (Flatwood Salamander, Bachman's sparrow, Pine Warbler, Carolina Wren, Red-Cockaded Woodpecker, Eastern Bluebird, Brown-Headed Nuthatch, Yellow Breasted Chat, Red-headed woodpecker, Eastern Kingbird, Common ground dove, Quail, Gopher Tortoises) along with how she fits into this world as part of the human species. The book interweaves family history and memoir with natural history writing—specifically, descriptions of the ecology of the vanishing longleaf pine forests that once blanketed much of the South. The book won the American Book Award, the Southern Book Critics Circle Award and the Southern Environmental Law Center Award for Outstanding Writing on the Southern environment. It also was chosen for the "All Georgia Reading the Same Book" project by the Georgia Center for the Book. Critics have noted that the book combines personal narrative with environmental advocacy, emphasizing the cultural and ecological importance of preserving the longleaf pine ecosystem.

In Wild Card Quilt (2003) she relates her experiences moving back home to Georgia with her son after attending graduate school in Montana. Pinhook (2005) tells the story of Pinhook Swamp, the land that connects the Okefenokee Swamp in Georgia and Osceola National Forest in Florida. Drifting into Darien, published in 2011, describes her experiences on and knowledge about the Altamaha River, which runs from middle Georgia to the Atlantic Ocean at Darien.

Ray published a book of poetry, A House of Branches (2010) and has been a contributor to Audubon, Orion and other magazines, as well as a commentator for NPR's Living on Earth. An environmental activist, she has campaigned on behalf of the Altamaha River and the Moody Swamp.

Her 2012 book The Seed Underground: A Growing Revolution to Save Food won multiple awards, including the Arlene Eisenberg Award for Writing that Makes a Difference, American Horticultural Society Book Award, Nautilus Gold Book Award, Garden Writers Association Gold Award, and the Green Prize for Sustainable Literature Award.

She previously taught in the Chatham University Low-Residency Master of Fine Arts Program in Creative Writing. Currently, she is a visiting professor and writer-in-residence at universities and colleges across the country. She lectures nationally on nature, agriculture, seeds, wildness, sustainability, writing, and politics of wholeness.

== Personal life ==
She has a son, Silas Ausable, who attended the University of Massachusetts and studied landscape architecture. She lives a simple, sustainable life in southern Georgia on Red Earth Farm with her husband and daughter. She is an organic gardener, she tends farm animals, she is a proponent of slow-cook food, and a seed saver. She is very active in her local community.

== Books ==
- Ecology of a Cracker Childhood, memoir (Minneapolis: Milkweed Editions, 1999). ISBN 9781571312341
- Wild Card Quilt: Taking a Chance on Home, memoir (Minneapolis: Milkweed Editions, 2003). ISBN 978-1-57131-272-3
- Between Two Rivers: Stories from the Red Hills to the Gulf, (Co-editor, with Susan Cerulean and Laura Newtown) nonfiction (Tallahassee: Heart of the Earth, 2004). ISBN 9780975933909
- Pinhook: Finding Wholeness in a Fragmented Land,, nonfiction (White River Junction: Chelsea Green Publishing Company, 2005). ISBN 9781931498746
- A House of Branches, poetry (Nicholasville: Wind Publications, 2010). ISBN 9781936138142
- Drifting into Darien: a Personal and Natural History of the Altamaha River, nonfiction (Athens: The University of Georgia Press, 2011). ISBN 9780820338156
- The Seed Underground: A Growing Revolution to Save Food, nonfiction (White River Junction: Chelsea Green Publishing Company, 2012). ISBN 978-1603583077
- Red Lanterns: Poems, poetry (Iris Press, 2021). ISBN 9781604542592
- Wild Spectacle: Seeking Wonders in a World beyond Humans, nonfiction (Trinity University Press, 2021). ISBN 9781595349576
