= Stephen S. Mulkey =

10th President of Unity Environmental University
- In office 2011–2016
- Preceded by: Mitchell Thomashow
- Succeeded by: Melik Khoury

Personal details
- Education: University of Missouri (BS, MS); University of Pennsylvania (PhD)

Stephen S. Mulkey was the CEO and President of Unity College from 2011 to 2015. He also led a major divestment effort from fossil fuels and promoted sustainable construction on the college's campus. Under Mulkey, Unity adopted sustainability as the lens through which all academics were viewed.

Since leaving Unity, Mulkey has been an advocate for combating climate change.
