= Melik Khoury =

American university administrator

Melik Peter Khoury

11th President of Unity Environmental University
- Incumbent
- Assumed office January 3, 2016
- Preceded by: Stephen S. Mulkey

Personal details
- Education: University of Maine at Fort Kent (BS); University of Maine (MBA); University of Phoenix (DBA)

Melik Peter Khoury is a university administrator serving as the 11th president of Unity Environmental University. Previously, Khoury served as a vice president at Culver–Stockton College from 2006 until 2009, at Upper Iowa University from 2009 until 2012, and at Unity from 2012 until 2016. He became the school's president on January 5, 2016.

== Early life and education ==
Khoury was born in Sierra Leone and spent his childhood in The Gambia. He enrolled at the University of Maine at Fort Kent in 1995, going on to obtain degrees in business administration from the University of Maine. In 2011, he earned a doctorate in business administration online from the University of Phoenix.

== Career ==
A graduate of the University of Maine at Fort Kent, Khoury began his academic career there as the school's director of admissions. He then began his first of several stints as a vice president, beginning with Paul Smith's College, where he was the vice president for enrollment management; then Culver-Stockton College, as the vice president for enrollment management and college marketing; and finally at Upper Iowa University, where he was the senior vice president for strategic positioning.

After four years in administrative roles at Unity College, Khoury was tapped to serve as interim president beginning January 3, 2016. In August of that year, Khoury was appointed as the college's eleventh president. At the time, Unity College had 665 students, and was anticipating enrollment of over 700 for the fall.

At Khoury's request, Unity College's trustees stripped voting privileges from faculty and undergraduate representatives in 2017. Khoury has been critical of consensus-based governance, arguing that it slows institutions and makes them more susceptible to "popularity contests." A new model, called the "enterprise model," was put into effect at Unity. Under the enterprise model, the school was divided into strategic education business units, or SEBUs, with each unit enjoying separate faculties, staffs, and policies.

In 2018, Khoury intervened to help a student from The Gambia who had twice been denied a visa to study in the United States. Khoury, who grew up in The Gambia, announced that Unity would enroll the student online, and flew to personally provide her with an orientation.

During the COVID-19 pandemic in the United States, Unity College closed its Unity, Maine, campus. Shortly thereafter, the college proposed permanently closing the campus and transitioning from a centralized residential campus to a hybrid education model. Trustees voted to allow Khoury to sell the campus. Khoury proposed reopening the campus if the college enrolled "a critical mass of 350 students in residence." The campus did briefly reopen in 2021; at the time, Khoury said the college had not pursued the option of selling the Unity campus. Unity, which changed its name to Unity Environmental University in 2023, has since moved in-person instruction to a new, smaller campus in New Gloucester, Maine. The campus in Unity was listed for sale in 2023 as well.

Khoury has been criticized for his focus on enrollment growth and online education. An instructor at the college who was laid off in 2020 after eleven years of employment said Khoury was turning Unity into "another Kaplan."

Enrollment has grown significantly since Khoury took office. In 2025, Khoury told the Portland Press Herald that enrollment at the institution was around 10,000 students, making it Maine's second-largest university by enrollment. The vast majority of students complete their degrees online, without in-person instruction.

== Recognition ==
Khoury has received several awards recognizing his leadership in higher education. In 2016, he was named to MaineBiz's NEXT Award list of emerging business leaders in Maine. In 2017, he was included on Maine Magazine's 50 under 50 list. Under Khoury’s leadership, the Unity College Board of Trustees received the Association of Governing Boards' John W. Nason Award for Board Leadership in 2018. In 2025, he received the Eileen Tosney Award for Career Service in Higher Education from the American Association of University Administrators. Also in 2025, he received the Distinguished Alumni Award at the inaugural Maine Center Awards, recognizing outstanding alumni from the University of Maine Graduate School of Business.

== Board service ==
In addition to his role as Unity’s President and CEO, Khoury is a member of the Unity Environmental University Board of Trustees. He was elected to the Board of Directors of the National Association of Independent Colleges and Universities (NAICU), Class of 2029.

== Personal life ==
Khoury has two adult sons.
