= Terrain.org =

- Language: English
- Edited by: Simmons B. Buntin

Publication details
- History: 1997 to present
- Publisher: Terrain Publishing (US)
- Frequency: Rolling schedule

Standard abbreviations
- ISO 4: Terrain.org

Indexing
- ISSN: 1932-9474

Links
- Journal homepage

Terrain.org: A Journal of the Built + Natural Environments is an online journal publishing editorials, poetry, essays, fiction, articles, reviews, an interview, the ARTerrain gallery, and the Unsprawl case study on a rolling schedule, with up to five new contributions per week. Terrain.org also hosts an annual contest in fiction, nonfiction, and poetry. It is based in Tucson, Arizona, United States.

== History and profile ==
Terrain.org was founded in 1997 by Simmons Buntin and Todd Ziebarth. The first issue appeared in summer 1998 and featured work by R.T. Smith, David Rothenberg, Rick Cole, James Howard Kunstler, Sherry Saye, and others.

Contributors and interview subjects since then include Alison Hawthorne Deming, David Quammen, Lauret Savoy, Terry Tempest Williams, Joy Harjo, Sandra Steingraber, Scott Russell Sanders, Kathryn Miles, Gary Snyder, Wendell Berry, Andrés Duany, and many others. Each issue is archived.

Terrain.org appears to be the first completely online environmentally oriented journal, and continues to be one of the most comprehensive journals with original content exploring the nexus between the built and natural environments where it exists, and attempting to generate a discourse where that nexus does not exist.

In March 2009 Web del Sol called Terrain.org a "Top 50 Literary Magazine and Metazine." Other awards include Dzanc Books Best of the Web selections in 2008, 2009, and 2010; Top 100 Architectural Blogs listing by International Listings (though Terrain.org is not a blog, it does offer the Terrain.org Blog); Planetizen Top 50 Website; and Utne Reader Best of the Alternative Web.

Terrain.org has editors as well as an international editorial board that serves primarily in an advisory capacity.

The online journal also has a partnership with the journal/book series Terra Nova: Nature & Culture, published by MIT Press. Terra Nova's editor Rothenberg is a Terrain.org editorial board member and contributing editor. Terrain.org occasionally republishes work originally appearing in print editions of Terra Nova.

Terrain.org often conducts readings, occasionally in conjunction with sponsors. For example, Terrain.org's 24th issue, with the theme of "Borders & Bridges," was launched with a reading featuring Rothenberg, Christopher Cokinos, Pamela Uschuk, and Deborah Fries in September 2009. It was hosted by the University of Arizona Poetry Center and co-sponsored by the Center for Biological Diversity.
