= Orion Society =

US non-profit organization

The Orion Society is a United States non-profit organization that engages environmental and cultural issues through publication of books, magazines, and educational materials, and facilitation of informational networks. It was founded in 1992 and is based in Great Barrington, Massachusetts. The Society is probably best known as publisher of Orion magazine.

== See also ==
- Environmentalism
- List of environmental organizations
- Sustainability
