= Tom Wessels =

American environmentalist

- Born: 1951 (age 74–75)

Academic background
- Education: University of New Hampshire (BS); University of Colorado Boulder (MA)

Academic work
- Discipline: Biology; Ecology
- Sub-discipline: Conservation biology Environmentalism
- Institutions: Antioch University New England; Windham College; The Putney School; Rainforest Alliance

Tom Wessels (born 1951) is an American terrestrial ecologist working as a professor at Antioch University New England in the Department of Environmental Studies, where he founded a master's program in conservation biology. He is the author of five books and is an active environmentalist.

== Education ==
Wessels earned a Bachelor of Science degree in wildlife biology from the University of New Hampshire and a Master of Arts in ecology at the University of Colorado at Boulder.

== Career ==
Wessels went directly into academia, beginning with a post at the now-defunct Windham College in Putney, Vermont. In 1978, he became an adjunct faculty member at Antioch University New England and was instrumental in developing numerous courses in Environmental Studies Department. He became a tenured faculty member at Antioch in 2000.

In addition to teaching at Antioch, Wessels has traveled on expedition to Iceland with Haraldur Sigurdsson. He chaired the Science department for ten years at The Putney School, a boarding high school in Putney, Vermont. He served as the chair of the Robert and Patricia Switzer Foundation, a foundation that provides grants and fellowships to promote environmental leadership. Since 1995 he has served as an ecological consultant for the Rainforest Alliance SmartWood Program in the Northeastern United States.

=== Social commentary ===
In his 2006 book The Myth of Progress, Wessels asserts that the aspiration to sustain indefinite exponential economic growth is an impossibility on the grounds that it violates three scientific principles: the limits to growth, the second law of thermodynamics and the law of self organization. An updated edition was published in 2013, with expanded discussion on the 2008 financial crisis.

== Books ==
- Gardner, Blake and Tom Wessels. Untamed Vermont (Thistle Hill Publications, 2003). ISBN 0-9705511-2-6
- Wessels, Thomas. New England's Roadside Ecology: Explore 30 of the Region's Unique Natural Areas (Timber Press, 2021). ISBN 978-1-64326-009-9
- Wessels, Tom. Reading the Forested Landscape: A Natural History of New England (The Countryman Press, 1997). ISBN 0-88150-378-9
- Wessels, Tom. The Granite Landscape: A Natural History of America's Mountain Domes, From Acadia to Yosemite (The Countryman Press, 2001). ISBN 0-88150-429-7
- Wessels, Tom. The Myth of Progress: Toward a Sustainable Future (University of Vermont Press, 2006). ISBN 1-58465-495-3
- Wessels, Tom. "Forest Forensics: A Field Guide to Reading the Forested Landscape" (The Countryman Press, 2010). ISBN 0-88150-918-3
