= Flatwoods salamander =

Flatwoods salamanders are mole salamanders of Florida, Georgia, and South Carolina:

- Ambystoma cingulatum, the frosted flatwoods salamander, native to the coastal plan in South Carolina, Georgia, and Florida east of the Apalachicola River
- Ambystoma bishopi, the reticulated flatwoods salamander, native to the western Florida panhandle and southwestern Georgia
