= Unity Environmental University =

Private university in Maine, U.S.

- Motto: America's Environmental University
- Type: Private university
- Established: September 7, 1965; 61 years ago
- Accreditation: NECHE
- Endowment: $18 million
- President: Melik Peter Khoury
- Faculty: 200
- Students: 9,100
- Location: New Gloucester, Maine, U.S.
- Campus: Rural, multiple sites
- Colors: Green and white
- Website: www.unity.edu

Unity Environmental University (formerly Unity College) is a private university in New Gloucester, Maine, United States. It offers in-person and online associate, baccalaureate, and master's degree programs on sustainability and environmental science. Unity is accredited by the New England Commission of Higher Education and is classified among "M3: Master’s Colleges and Universities – Small programs".

Initially founded as a residential institute in Unity, Maine, the university expanded into online education in 2016, growing its enrollment and number of academic programs. The university moved its online program to the Pineland Farms campus in New Gloucester in 2019 and later relocated their administrative headquarters there. It also operates a farm and indoor growing facility in Thorndike and an outdoor center in Moose River.

== History ==
The college was founded in 1965 as the Unity Institute of Liberal Arts and Sciences with a faculty of 15 and a student body of 39. The founders, a group of local business people, were looking for ways to counter economic decline in the town of Unity. Two years later, it changed its name to Unity College and in 1969 awarded degrees to its first graduating class of 24.

The college's founders considered opening a bowling alley and a sock factory before settling on the college. The college adopted its environmental-oriented in 1977. It built the first Passivhaus college residence in the U.S. in 2011 and became the first college in the country to divest its endowment of fossil fuels in 2012.

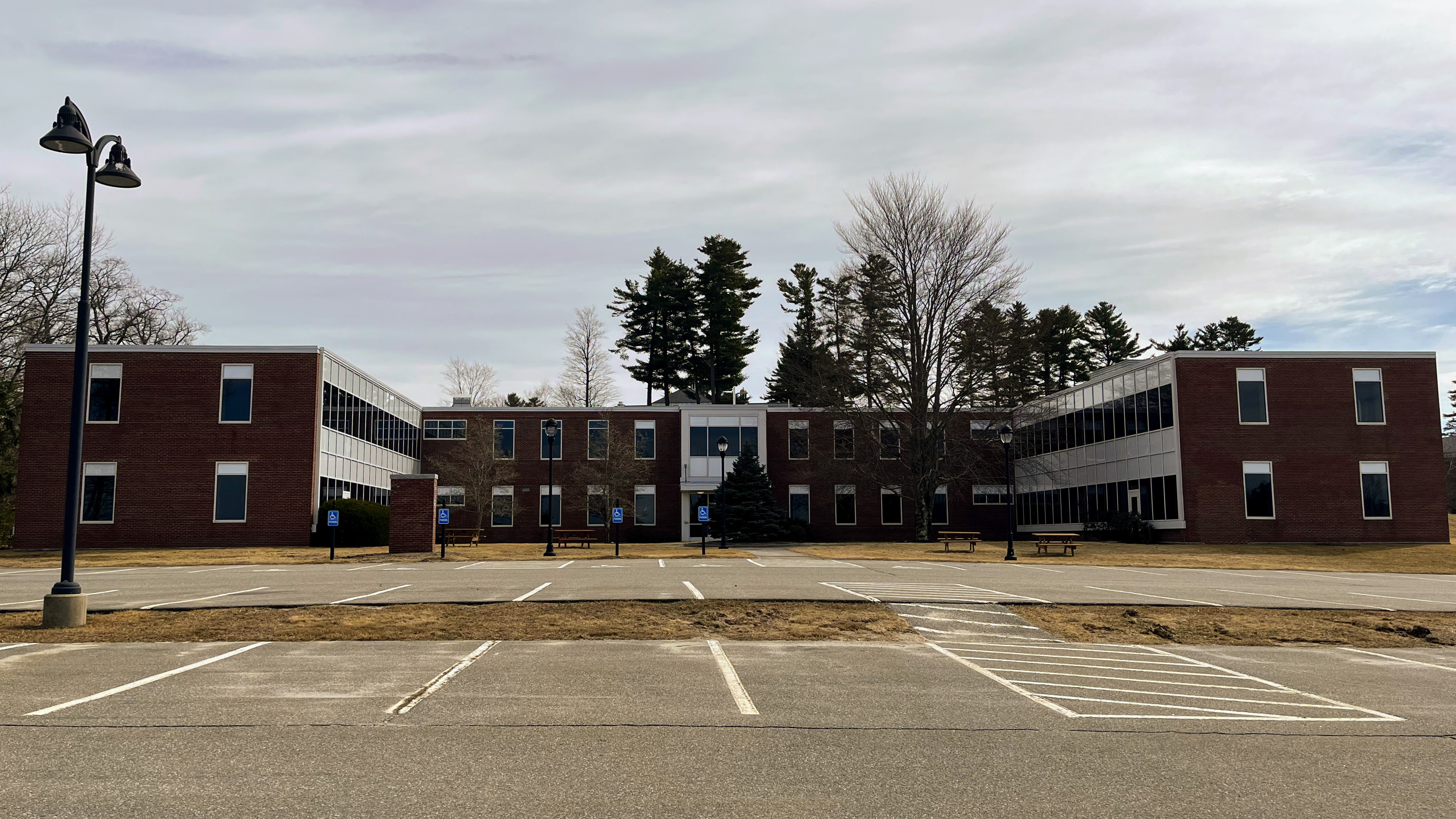
Freeport Hall, the primary academic building at Unity Environmental University at Pineland

Unity underwent a tumultuous period in the 1980s, when it was placed on probation by its accreditor. President Wilson Hess, a professor who was selected to lead the college in the middle of the crisis, led fundraising efforts to put Unity on a firm financial footing. The college received an unprecedented $10 million gift in 2011 and its endowment has since grown to $18 million.

Unity began offering online education in 2016 with its first master's degree, in Professional Science. It began offering undergraduate online programs two years later. In 2020, Unity College closed its Unity campus due to the COVID-19 pandemic in the United States. During the pandemic-related closure, the college announced it would pivot away from a traditional residential model and would consider selling its campus. The proposed sale of the Unity, Maine campus and pivot towards distance education frustrated alumni and some faculty, who accused the school of drifting from its environmental mission. In 2021, President Melik Khoury told the Morning Sentinel that the campus was "never listed for sale" and that it would reopen for the fall term, though two years later it was offered for sale as the school continued its shift towards online education and in-person education in New Gloucester and other sites. The Unity, Maine, campus sold in June 2026.

The institution moved its online offices from Unity to New Gloucester in 2019. In 2021, when the fate of the Unity, Maine campus was still uncertain, the college announced a new online and commuter junior college, which is also located in New Gloucester called the Technical Institute for Environmental Professions. The college also moved to New Gloucester. Residential students complete their general education courses online under the college's in-person model and can live on the University of Southern Maine campus forty minutes away in Gorham, Maine, where they can utilize USM's libraries and other facilities.

On February 27, 2023, Unity College announced it would change its name to Unity Environmental University. The new name was introduced gradually over the next year. In 2023, the university announced it had more than 7,500 full-time students across all of its educational units with its online programming being hailed as an "uncommon success story."

Past presidents include Mitchell Thomashow, Wilson Hess, and Stephen S. Mulkey.

== Academics ==
Unity is divided into Sustainable Education Business Units rather than schools and colleges like a traditional university. These are:

- Distance Education
- In-person Learning
- Sustainable Ventures
- Technical Institute for Environmental Professions

The Technical Institute for Environmental Professions offers associate degrees, while the Distance Education offers both Bachelor of Science degrees and the Professional Science Master's Degree. Bachelor's degrees are also available from Unity Environmental University at Pineland.

== Athletics ==
Unity had an athletics program and was a member of the Division II level of the United States Collegiate Athletic Association (USCAA), primarily competing in the Yankee Small College Conference (YSCC) from 2008–09 until 2018–19. Known as the Rams, the athletics program featured both USCAA-sanctioned sports and club sports, including a woodsman team.

Unity competed in up to nine intercollegiate varsity sports: Men's sports included basketball, cross country, soccer and track & field; while women's sports included basketball, cross country, soccer, track & field and volleyball. Additionally Unity had a number of club sports: woodsmen's team, ice hockey, indoor soccer, lacrosse, martial arts and ultimate frisbee; plus intramural sports.

=== Accomplishments ===
In 1992, the Unity College women's cross country team won the NAIA Division 5 New England Championship meet at Vermont State University (formerly Lyndon, Castleton, and Johnson State Colleges) in Johnson, Vermont. The team was captained by Michelle Belanger. In 1996, the Unity College men's cross country team won the Dirgio Conference championship meet at Maine Maritime Academy in Castine, Maine.

In 1996, the women's and men's teams also won the National Small College Athletic Association (NSCAA) Cross Country National Championship meet in Rochester Hills, Michigan. These were Unity College's first-ever National Championship teams and seven runners earned 'All-American' honors. The men's team was captained by Joel Flewelling and Shawn Jyawook. The women's team was captained by Nabuko Tawara and Rebecca Roy. The teams were coached by Mark Kibler. The NSCAA was the predecessor of today's United States Collegiate Athletic Association (USCAA)..
