= Antioch University New England =

Campus of Antioch University in New Hampshire

Coordinates: 42°55′55″N 72°17′38″W

- Motto: "Because the world needs you now."
- Type: Private
- Established: 1964
- Affiliations: NHCUC, UArctic
- President: Lori E. Varlotta
- Provost: Sandra Madar
- Students: 1,200
- Location: Keene, New Hampshire, 03431, United States
- Campus: Urban
- Website: www.antioch.edu/new-england

Antioch University New England is a private graduate school located in Keene, New Hampshire, United States. It is part of the Antioch University system, a private, non-profit, 501(c)(3) institution that includes campuses in Seattle, Washington; Los Angeles, California; and Santa Barbara, California. It is accredited by the Higher Learning Commission. The most well-known campus was Antioch College in Yellow Springs, Ohio, which is now independent of the Antioch University system.

== History ==
In 1964, Antioch College opened a new center on the East Coast to offer graduate education with a practical bent. The new school, called Antioch-Putney, opened its doors in Putney, Vermont.

The school moved from Putney to Harrisville, in the New Hampshire hills. It expanded, offering more graduate programs and expanding the scope of the education department. The name was then changed to Antioch New England Graduate School.

Antioch College of Ohio was the most well-known campus in the system. It was founded in 1852 by Horace Mann and is known for its liberal politics, such as its 1990 policy requiring explicit verbal consent before any sexual activity amongst students. Coretta Scott King and Stephen Jay Gould were some noteworthy graduates.

However, the Antioch system faced difficult times in the 2000s. Its board chose to close Antioch College to retrench and reduce costs. An alumni-controlled group was able to negotiate a separation between Antioch College and the adult education system of which Antioch University New England is a part. AUNE no longer is affiliated with Antioch College.

Antioch University New England, as it is currently known, is situated in a renovated furniture factory in Keene, New Hampshire, almost exactly midway between the former locations. It serves a student body of around 1,000 students, offering four certificate programs, master's degrees in twenty-three different programs, and three doctoral programs.

According to Antioch University New England, 73% of its students are female and 70% are from New England.

=== Mission ===
Students are required to perform up to 600 hours of on-the-job experience through internships. Classes are scheduled with the working student in mind. To create the time for those internships, each department usually holds all its classes on one or two days of the week.

== Academics ==
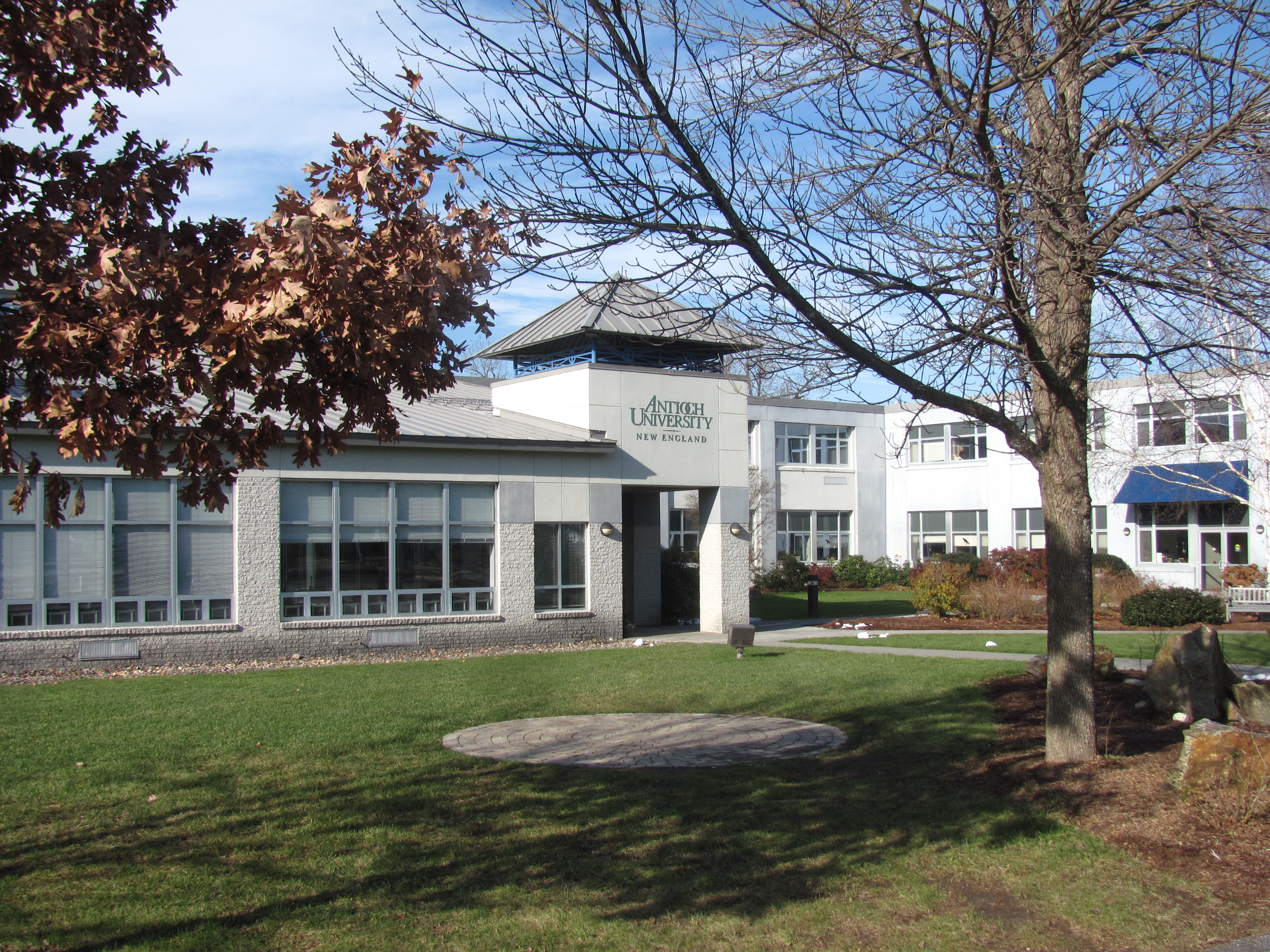
Antioch University New England

=== Applied psychology ===
Antioch University New England Department of Applied Psychology offers master's degrees in

- Clinical Mental Health Counseling, accredited by CACREP, prepares students to sit for examination as an LMHC/LPC and includes an option to focus specifically on Substance Abuse Counseling. It is the only program in New England that offers graduates the ability to be dually licensed as Mental Health Counselors (LMHC/LPC) and Substance Abuse Counselors (LDAC).
- Dance/Movement Therapy and Counseling is one of only six graduate programs in the United States approved by the American Dance Therapy Association. Likewise, students in this program have the option of taking courses that will lead them to LMHC licensure.
- Marriage & Family Therapy. Accredited by COAMFTE, graduates of the Masters program are able to practice as Licensed Marriage & Family Therapists (LMFT).

The department also offers:

- PhD in Marriage and Family Therapy
- Certificates in Marriage and Family Therapy, Autism Spectrum Disorders, and Applied Behavior Analysis

=== Clinical psychology ===
The New England campus of Antioch University offers an APA-accredited Doctor of Psychology (PsyD) program in clinical psychology.

=== Education ===
Antioch University New England offers master's of education degrees in elementary, early childhood, and special education teacher certification; working educators; and Waldorf teacher education, as well as a certificate in Waldorf teacher education. The Working Educator MEd program offers seven concentrations: Next Generation Learning Using Technology, Educating for Sustainability, Teacher Leadership, Problem-Based Learning Using Critical Skills, Self-Designed, Autism Spectrum Disorders, and Applied Behavior Analysis, as well as an MEd and a certificate in Principal Certification.

The university offers one of three established Waldorf teacher training programs in the United States (besides Sunbridge Institute and Rudolf Steiner College). Antioch's Waldorf training program offers optional state certification and master's degree additions to the Waldorf training. The Antioch Center for School Renewal, the service wing of the education department, provides support for teachers and schools.

=== Environmental studies ===
AUNE offers a master's degree in environmental studies with concentrations in conservation biology, advocacy for social justice and sustainability, environmental education, science teacher certification, sustainable development, and climate change, and self-designed studies. It also offers a master's degree in resource management and conservation and a Ph.D. in environmental studies.

Antioch University New England's Advocacy for Social Justice and Sustainability concentration was recognized by MoveOn.org's executive director, Eli Pariser, as a model program for working positively to promote and protect the environment.

The Antioch Center for Climate Preparedness and Community Resilience "delivers applied research, consulting, education and training" and partners in an Ecovation Hub program with the School for International Training, Greenfield Community College, and Keene State College.

=== Management ===
Antioch New England offers a Master's of Business Administration (MBA) in sustainability, as well as a certificate is sustainable business.

== Alumni and faculty ==
=== Notable Antioch University New England faculty ===
- David Sobel, faculty in the Education Department and earned his MEd at Antioch He has written about place-based education.
- Tom Wessels, emeritus in the Department of Environmental Studies

=== Notable Antioch University New England alumni ===
- Chad Allen, actor and psychologist
- Jerome Clayton Glenn (b. 1945), (MA in Teaching Social Science - Futuristics) is the co-founder and Director of The Millennium Project and former executive director of the American Council for the United Nations University.
- David C. Webster, member of the Maine House of Representatives
