= Orion (online magazine) =

American magazine

- Editor-in-Chief: Tajja Isen
- Categories: nature, culture, environment
- Frequency: Quarterly
- Publisher: Neal Thompson
- Paid circulation: 19,000
- Total circulation: 25,000 (2008)
- First issue: June 1982
- Company: The Orion Society
- Country: United States
- Based in: Great Barrington, Massachusetts, Northampton, Massachusetts
- Language: English
- Website: OrionMagazine.org
- ISSN: 1058-3130

Orion is an advertisement-free nonprofit quarterly magazine focused on nature, culture, and place addressing environmental and social issues. It is published quarterly.

In 2010, Orion was the recipient of Utne Reader magazine's Utne Independent Press Award for General Excellence.

== Orion Book Award ==
Since 2007, the magazine has administered an annual book award competition, which is described by the magazine as "given annually to a book that addresses the human relationship with the natural world in a fresh, thought provoking, and engaging manner. Four additional books are named as finalists."
