= Catriona Sandilands =

Canadian writer and academic (born 1964)

22nd President of the Association for the Study of Literature and Environment
- In office 2015
- Preceded by: Mark C. Long
- Succeeded by: Christoph Irmscher; Anthony Lioi

Personal details
- Citizenship: Canadian
- Education: University of Victoria (BA, 1987); York University (MA, 1988; PhD, 1996)
- Profession: Academician
- Website: catesandilands.ca

Catriona Alison Hayward Mortimer-Sandilands (born 1964) is a Canadian writer and scholar in the environmental humanities. She is best known for her conception of queer ecology. As of 2026, she is a Professor in the Faculty of Environmental Studies at York University. Between 2004 and 2014, she was a Canada Research Chair in Sustainability and Culture. Sandilands served as president of the Association for the Study of Literature and Environment in 2015, and she was also a Fellow of the Pierre Elliott Trudeau Foundation in 2016. She is also a past President of the Association for Literature, Environment, and Culture in Canada (ALECC) and the American Society for Literature and the Environment (ASLE).

Mortimer-Sandilands is the author of Good-Natured Feminist (1999). She also edited This Elusive Land (2004) with Melody Hessing and Rebecca Raglon, Queer Ecologies (2010) with Bruce Erickson, and Rising Tides (2019).

== Education ==
Mortimer-Sandilands received a Bachelor of Arts (1987) in sociology from the University of Victoria and a creative writing certificate from Simon Fraser University. She then attended York University, from which she earned a Master of Arts (1988) and Doctor of Philosophy (1996), both in sociology.

== Career ==
Mortimer-Sandilands started her career as an assistant professor at York University, working in the Faculty of Environmental Studies from 1994 to 1999, at which point she became an associate professor, reaching the status of full professor in 2010, a position she continues to hold in 2026. From 2000 to 2004, she was also an adjunct professor at the University of Victoria in the Department of Women's Studies.

In addition to her teaching positions, Sandilands held the position of Canada Research Chair in Sustainability and Culture at York University from 2004 to 2013. In 2015, she served as president of the Association for the Study of Literature and Environment, and in 2016, she was a fellow of the Pierre Elliott Trudeau Foundation. She is also a past President of the Association for Literature, Environment, and Culture in Canada (ALECC) and the American Society for Literature and the Environment (ASLE).

Mortimer-Sandilands is the author of Good-Natured Feminist (1999). She also edited This Elusive Land (2004) with Melody Hessing and Rebecca Raglon, Queer Ecologies (2010) with Bruce Erickson, and Rising Tides (2019). Sandilands has also written extensively on environment, society, culture and literature in publications such as The Guardian and the Los Angeles Review of Books. In 2013, Lisa Szabo-Jones wrote that Sandilands, Pamela Banting, and Stephanie Posthumus were "three figures who were instrumental in bringing meetings together" at the 2005 ASLE Conference, which led to the formation of ALECC and the creation of ALECC's flagship journal The Goose.

=== The Good-Natured Feminist (1999) ===
Sandilands published her first book, The Good-Natured Feminist, with the University of Minnesota Press in 1999. The book describes itself as "a foundational statement of the democratic promise of ecofeminism", and explores identity, gender and democracy through the lens of ecofeminism and the perceived relationships between the category of "women" and nature. Sandilands invokes a multitude of contemporary feminist and political theorizations of democracy, including Donna Haraway's cyborg feminism.

Sue Stack, writing for Environmental Practice, summarized the book's central argument: "If we are interested in seeing change in the way humans affect the planet, then we would be well advised to be cautious about using labels and aligning ourselves with specific 'movements' or 'identities,' because that can lead to isolation of our movement, alienation of other individuals, and solidification and lack of dialogue, all of which will work against desired changes".

In a review for Environmental Ethics, Melissa Clarke described The Good-Natured Feminist as "highly recommended reading, especially for those who understand ecofeminism as an attempt to forge an essential link between 'woman' (often equated with 'maternal') and 'nature.'" Stacy Alaimo, writing for TOPIA, described The Good-Natured Feminist "a strikingly original and vitally important contribution to debates in feminist theory, environmental thought, and cultural studies", as well as "an essential text not only for those engaged in ecofeminist projects, but, more broadly, for anyone interested in feminism, environmentalism, or social and political theory."

Susan Wismer, writing for the Canadian Journal of Political Science, wrote a generally positive review, though noted that the book's foray into post-modernism can be alienating to readers. Wismer concluded, "The merits of [Sandlands's] argument deserve a broader audience than the small group of intellectuals who are comfortable with the complexities of the typical language of postmodern discussion. [... M]y hope is that soon we will no longer need to obscure our ideas with overly difficult language."

=== This Elusive Land (2004) ===
In 2004, Sandilands co-edited the multidisciplinary anthology This Elusive Land: Women and the Canadian Environment with Melody Hessing and Rebecca Raglon. The multidisciplinary collection "introduces readers to women's perceptions and experiences of the Canadian natural environment". It consists of four sections: "Explorers and Settlers", "Making a Living, Making a Life", "Environmental Politics: Issues at Home and Abroad", and "Rethinking the Environment". According to Iranian sociologist Peyman Vahabzadeh, This Elusive Land "inaugurates the belated articulation between ecofeminism and Canadian studies".

Anna J. Willow praised the collection for its interdisciplinary approach to exploring the "intersections between gender, the environment, and the Canadian experience". While Vahabzadeh found the collection valuable, he noted that it "leaves many loose ends". Joanna Dean similarly found the collection generally valuable, though stated it lacked contributions from historians.

=== Queer Ecologies (2010) ===
Mortimer-Sandilands's most well-known work to date, Queer Ecologies: Sex, Nature, Politics, Desire, co-edited with Bruce Erickson, was published by Indiana University Press in 2010. It was "the first book-length volume to establish the intersections of queer theory and environmentalisms at such depth .... [and] created a rich field for further research." Queer Ecologies "advances [Mortimer-Sandilands's] earlier work on ecofeminism, democracy and sexuality", and explores "such issues as animal sex, species politics, environmental justice, lesbian space and 'gay' ghettos, AIDS literatures, and queer nationalities".

=== Rising Tides (2019) ===
Mortimer-Sandilands's edited collection Rising Tides was published with Caitlin Press in 2019. The collection includes short fiction, creative non-fiction, memoir and poetry that address climate change and explores the connections between colonialism, climate change, and climate justice in Canada. Notable contributors include Carleigh Baker, Stephen Collis, Ann Eriksson, Rosemary Georgeson, Hiromi Goto, David Huebert, Sonnet L'Abbé, Kyo Maclear, Deborah McGregor, Betsy Warland, and Rita Wong. Writing for ISLE, Katie Hogan highlighted how "Rising Tides deftly balances histories of structural abuse and stories of persistence".

== Selected publications ==
- "This Land Has Called Forth from You Your Strength as a Lesbian": A Separatist Ecology? (Toronto: Institute for Women's Studies and Gender Studies, University of Toronto, Research Monograph #5). 50 pp. (2002)
- Sandilands, Catriona (1999). The Good-Natured Feminist: Ecofeminism and Democracy. Minneapolis: University of Minnesota Press. ISBN 978-0-816-63097-4.
- Hessing, Melody; Raglon, Rebecca; Sandilands, Catriona, eds. (2004). This Elusive Land: Women and the Canadian Environment. Vancouver: University of British Columbia Press. ISBN 978-0-774-81106-4.
- Mortimer-Sandilands, Catriona; Erickson, Bruce, eds. (2010). Queer Ecologies: Sex, Nature, Politics, Desire. Bloomington: Indiana University Press. ISBN 978-0-253-22203-9.
- Mortimer-Sandilands, Catriona, ed. (2019). Rising Tides: Reflections for Climate Changing Times. Halfmoon Bay: Caitlin Press.
