= Greta Gaard =

American feminist

- Occupations: Ecofeminist writer, scholar, activist, and documentary filmmaker
- Known for: Gaard documented the transition of the U.S. Green movement into the Green Party of the United States in her book, Ecological Politics

Greta Gaard is an ecofeminist writer, scholar, activist, and documentary filmmaker. Gaard's academic work in the realms of ecocriticism and ecocomposition is widely cited by scholars in the disciplines of composition and literary criticism. Her theoretical work extending ecofeminist thought into queer theory, queer ecology, vegetarianism, and animal liberation has been influential within women's studies. A cofounder of the Minnesota Green Party, Gaard documented the transition of the U.S. Green movement into the Green Party of the United States in her book, Ecological Politics. She is currently a professor of English at University of Wisconsin-River Falls and a community faculty member in Women's Studies at Metropolitan State University, Twin Cities.

== Ecocriticism and ecocomposition ==
Gaard has applied ecofeminist theory to both literary criticism and composition instruction, thereby contributing feminist insights to the emerging fields of ecocriticism and ecocomposition.

Ecofeminist Literary Criticism: Theory, Interpretation, Pedagogy, edited by Gaard and Patrick D. Murphy, was the first anthology to examine not only how ecofeminist theory might enhance literary criticism but also how close reading of texts might inform ecofeminist theory and activist practice. This development in ecocriticism was welcomed by scholars who, along with Simon C. Estok, believe that "if ecocriticism is to have any effect outside of the narrow confines of academia, then it must not only define itself but also address the issue of values in ways that connect meaningfully with the non-academic world."

Gaard's International Perspectives in Feminist Ecocriticism, co-edited by Gaard, Simon Estok, and Serpil Oppermann, updates the U.S.-based anthology, offering an international collection of scholarship that includes ecocritical theory, literary criticism, and ecocultural analyses, bringing a diversity of perspectives in terms of gender, sexuality, and race. Reconnecting with the histories of feminist and ecofeminist literary criticism, and utilizing new developments in postcolonial ecocriticism, animal studies, queer theory, feminist and gender studies, cross-cultural and international ecocriticism, this volume develops a continuing and international feminist ecocritical perspective on literature, language, and culture.

Gaard's widely cited contribution to Ecocomposition: Theoretical and Practical Approaches similarly argues for the activist applications of scholarly theory, asserting that "at its most inclusive, ecocomposition has the potential to address social issues such as feminism, environmental ethics, multiculturalism, politics, and economics, all by examining matters of form and style, audience and argumentation, and reliable sources and documentation."

== Ecofeminist theory ==
"One of the most influential ecofeminist scholars," Gaard has extended ecofeminist theory by mapping linkages with queer theory and by compiling ecofeminist ideas concerning vegetarianism and animal liberation.

Prior to Gaard's germinal 1997 article, "Toward a Queer Ecofeminism," published first in the scholarly journal Hypatia and then anthologized in Perspectives on Environmental Justice, Gender, Sexuality, and Activism, ecofeminism and queer theory were separate realms within feminism. As Gaard writes in her introduction to that piece,

Although many ecofeminists acknowledge heterosexism as a problem, a systematic exploration of the potential intersections of ecofeminist and queer theories has yet to be made. By interrogating social constructions of the "natural," the various uses of Christianity as a logic of domination, and the rhetoric of colonialism, this essay finds those intersections and argues for the importance of developing a queer ecofeminism.

Numerous scholars have since drawn upon that essay in formulating their theories. Gaard's 1993 anthology, Ecofeminism: Women, Animals, Nature also introduced new theoretical intersections. As Gaard noted in her introduction to the pieces collected in that work, "in the three anthologies published at the time of this writing, ecofeminism has failed to locate animals as central to any discussion of ethics involving women and nature." Gaard followed up that anthology with a 2003 review of vegetarian ecofeminist thought.

Gaard's more recent scholarship has addressed "Literary Milk: Breastfeeding Across Race, Class, and Species" (2013) and "Postcolonial Milk Studies" (2013), "Indigenous Women and the Environmental Humanities" (2014), "Ecofeminism and Climate Change" (2015), "Feminism and Environmental Justice" (2017), "Ecofeminist Aesthetics"(2018), "Out of the Closets and Into the Climate! Queer Feminist Climate Justice" (2019) and a "Just Ecofeminist Sustainability" (2017). (Full texts available here.) As of 2017, her most recent monograph was Critical Ecofeminism, a volume rooted in and advancing articulations of Australian philosopher Val Plumwood's ecological feminism.

== Ecological politics ==
As an activist, Gaard participated in the Green movement for more than a decade. In 1993, she was among the founders of the Minnesota Green Party. In 1994, she documented ecofeminist participation in the Greens in the video documentary, Thinking Green: Ecofeminists and the Greens. Gaard's 1998 book, Ecological Politics: Ecofeminists and the Greens, draws upon interviews with scores of participants to tell the story of the controversial transition of the Green movement into a national political party from multiple perspectives, concluding that

Ecofeminists can learn from the Greens and from the work of ecofeminists in the Greens. A radically democratic movement for social and environmental justice will be larger than ecofeminism and larger than the Greens. Yet we can only bring about that movement by working with and through our communities--and our communities will always be partial, unrepresentative, incomplete. Only the coalition of a variety of progressive communities will bring about the transformations needed to articulate a radical democracy, and in that coalition, an ecofeminist vision will find expression.

== Creative and critical writing ==
Gaard also has published fiction, poetry, and creative nonfiction as well as critical essays in non-scholarly publications. Her 2007 book, The Nature of Home, collects several works of creative nonfiction centered on the question of ecological connections to and within places.

With the COVID-19 pandemic, Gaard launched an "Open Letter to the Environmental Humanities" inviting scholars to commit to aligning their environmental scholarship with their behaviors and commit to limit flying, limit driving, and choosing to eat ethically, ecologically, and locally sourced foods. The letter was signed and augmented by over 40 international scholars and is still open to signatures. The letter and a special cluster focusing on COVID-19 & Climate appeared in BifrostOnline's Spring 2020 issue here.

== Other activism ==
Gaard was a member of the now-inactive Feminists for Animal Rights, publishing some essays in the FAR newsletter. Other activism opposing anti-labor and anti-environment global trade policies at the World Trade Organization meeting in Seattle (1999), climate capitalism at the 350.Org-launched People's Climate March (2014), offering solidarity actions for the Water Protectors at Standing Rock (2017), and standing in continued opposition to Enbridge's Line 3 pipeline, which runs through untouched wetlands and the treaty territory of Anishinaabe peoples in Northern Minnesota (2014 to present), exemplify some of her eco-justice commitments.

== Selected publications ==
=== Books ===
- Contemplative Practices and Anti-Oppressive Pedagogies for Higher Education: Bridging the Disciplines. Co-edited with Bengu Erguner-Tekinalp. Routledge, 2022.
- Critical Ecofeminism. Rowman & Littlefield/Lexington Books, 2017.
- International Perspectives in Feminist Ecocriticism. Routledge, 2013.
- The Nature of Home: Taking Root in a Place.' University of Arizona Press, 2007.
- Ecological Politics: Ecofeminists and the Greens. Temple University Press, 1998.
- Ecofeminist Literary Criticism (Editor, with Patrick Murphy). University of Illinois Press, 1998.
- Ecofeminism: Women, Animals, Nature (Editor). Philadelphia: Temple University Press, 1993.

=== Chapters ===
- "Ecofeminism and Animals." pp. 647–53 in Encyclopedia of Animals and Humans, ed. Marc Bekoff. Vol. 2. Westport, Connecticut: Greenwood Publishing Group, 2007.
- "Toward a Queer Ecofeminism." pp. 21–44. In New Perspectives on Environmental Justice, Gender, Sexuality, and Activism. Ed. Rachel Stein. New Jersey: Rutgers University Press, 2004.
- "Ecofeminism and EcoComposition." pp. 163–178. In Ecocomposition: Theoretical and Practical Approaches. Ed. Sid Dobrin and Christian Weisser. Albany: State University of New York Press, 2001.
- "Identity Politics as a Comparative Poetics." pp. 230–43. In Borderwork: Feminist Engagements with Comparative Literature. Ed. Margaret Higonnet. Ithaca: Cornell University Press, 1994.

=== Peer-reviewed articles ===
- Unstoried Air, Breath, Embodiment ISLE: Interdisciplinary Studies in Literature and Environment (2020), 1-28.
- Mindful Ecofeminism and the Multispecies Sangha Tarka 3(2020), 139-147.
- Toward a Feminist Postcolonial Milk Studies American Quarterly (2013), 595-618.
- Ecofeminism Revisited: Rejecting Essentialism and Replacing Species in a Material Feminist Environmentalism Feminist Formations 23:2 (2011): 26-53.
- New Directions For Ecofeminism: Toward a More Feminist Ecocriticism ISLE 17:4 (2010): 643-665.
- "Reproductive Technology, or Reproductive Justice? An Ecofeminist, Environmental Justice Perspective on the Rhetoric of Choice." Ethics & the Environment 15:2 (Fall 2010):103-129.
- Toward an Ecopedagogy of Children's Environmental Literature Green Theory and Praxis: The Journal of Ecopedagogy 4:2 (2008): 11-24.
- "Vegetarian Ecofeminism: A Review Essay." Frontiers 23:3(2003):117-146.
- "Ecofeminism on the Wing: Perspectives on Human-Animal Relations." Women & Environments 52/53 (Fall 2001):19-22.
- "Women, Water, Energy: An Ecofeminist Approach." Organization & Environment 14:2 (June 2001):157-172.
- "Tools for a Cross-Cultural Feminist Ethics: Ethical Contexts and Contents in the Makah Whale Hunt." Hypatia 16.1 (Winter 2001):1-26.
- "Strategies for a Cross-Cultural Ecofeminist Ethics: Interrogating Tradition, Preserving Nature in Linda Hogan's Power and Alice Walker's Possessing the Secret of Joy." The Bucknell Review 44:1 (March 2000):82-101.
- "Toward a Queer Ecofeminism." Hypatia 12:1(Winter 1997):114-37.
- "Ecofeminism and Wilderness." Environmental Ethics 19:1 (Spring 1997):5-24.
- "Hiking Without a Map: Reflections on Teaching Ecofeminist Literary Criticism." Interdisciplinary Studies in Literature and Environment 3:1(Fall 1996):155-82.
- "Ecofeminism: Toward Global Justice and Planetary Health." (with Lori Gruen) Society and Nature 2:1 (1993):1-35.

=== Creative nonfiction ===
- "Queer by Nature." pp. 147–57 in Love, West Hollywood. Ed. James Berg and Chris Freeman. Alyson Publications, 2008.
- "Explosion." Ethics & Environment 8:2 (Winter 2003):71-79.
- "Family of Origin, Family of Land." Interdisciplinary Studies in Literature and Environment 8:2 (Summer 2001):237-51.
- "Ecofeminism and Home." IRIS: A Journal about Women 37(Spring/Summer 1998):62-67.

=== Other publications ===
- "Milking Mother Nature: An Ecofeminist Critique of rBGH." The Ecologist 24:6 (November/December 1994):1-2.
- "Misunderstanding Ecofeminism." Z Papers 3:1(January–March 1994):20-24.

== Video documentaries ==
- "River Farm, An Intentional Community." 9:00 minutes. (1998)
- "Ecofeminism Now!" 37:00 minutes. (1996). Available at https://www.youtube.com/watch?v=BTbLZrwqZ2M
- "Thinking Green: Ecofeminists and the Greens." 35:00 minutes. (1994) Available at https://www.youtube.com/watch?v=zAowuSt8AHk
- "Building Green Communities." 26:00 minutes (1993).
- "We, The People: The 1993 March on Washington for Gay, Lesbian, and Bi Equal Rights." Available at https://www.youtube.com/watch?v=-aAxODKIjh8&list=PL3-0fheS2RYLrEOwDgqT6Rw-z4deUkq2o&index=4
