= John Tallmadge =

American activist

4th President of the Association for the Study of Literature and Environment
- In office 1997
- Preceded by: Michael P. Branch
- Succeeded by: Louise Westling

Personal details
- Citizenship: American
- Education: PhD
- Alma mater: Yale University
- Website: http://johntallmadge.com/

John Tallmadge is an American author and essayist on issues related to nature and culture. He is in private practice as an educational and literary consultant after a career in higher education, most recently as a core professor of Literature and Environmental Studies at Union Institute and University in Cincinnati, Ohio. He served as president of the Association for the Study of Literature and Environment (ASLE) and director of the Orion Society. He is a U.S. Army veteran.

== Biography ==
John Tallmadge grew up in northern New Jersey. He credits his urban upbringing with instilling in him "a childhood longing for lakes and forests". He increasingly experienced the natural world at Dartmouth College and visiting Big Sur and the High Sierra while in the Army. Those experiences encouraged him to explore nature writers like Thoreau and John Muir. The outdoors complimented the academic work that he was pursuing and he applied his graduate studies in comparative literature to his passion for the outdoors.

His studies in nature writing fall under the genre of ecocriticism, a term coined by William Rueckert in 1978, and focus on the works of Thoreau, John Muir, Edward Abbey, and Aldo Leopold.

He served in the United States Army in California in the late 1960s in a Russian language program.

Tallmadge is married. He lives with his family in Cincinnati.

== Career ==
Tallmadge graduated from Dartmouth College in 1969 before the "Army preempted grad school." He received his PhD from Yale University in 1977 in comparative literature. He proceeded to teach at Yale, the University of Utah, Carleton College, the Associated Colleges of the Midwest, and Dartmouth College, before settling at TUI. He served as a dean there from 1987 to 1992.

Tallmadge worked as a consultant in developing curricula at Green Mountain College, University of Kentucky, and Antioch University New England. He consulted at Concordia College, Chatham College, the Roger Tory Peterson Institute, and the Cincinnati Museum of Natural History and Science. He offers workshops on the themes of nature and human values, spirituality, and writing, as well as seminars on personal and professional development for college faculty.

Tallmadge has been published in the Utne Reader, Orion magazine, Audubon Magazine, Whole Terrain, the Michigan Quarterly Review, the Interdisciplinary Studies in Literature and Environment (ISLE), the North Dakota Quarterly, the Emerson Society Quarterly, and Witness.

== Works ==
- Leslie, Clare Walker, John Tallmadge, and Tom Wessels. Into the Field: A Guide to Locally Focused Learning (Orion Society, 2005). ISBN 0-913098-52-3
- Tallmadge, John. Meeting the Tree of Life: A Teacher's Path (University of Utah Press, 1997). ISBN 0-87480-531-7
- Tallmadge, John, and Harry Harrington, eds. Reading Under the Sign of Nature: New Essays in Ecocriticism (University of Utah Press, 2000). ISBN 0-87480-648-8
- Tallmadge, John. The Cincinnati Arch: Learning from Nature in the City (University of Georgia Press, 2004). ISBN 0-8203-2676-3

== Articles available online ==
- A Matter of Scale
- Deerslayer with a Degree
- Meeting the Tree of Life
- Narrative Ecocriticism
- The Nature of Terror
- The Wild Within
- Toward a Natural History of Reading
