= Iovino =

Iovino is a surname. Notable people with this surname include:

- Pam Iovino, American politician
- Salvatore Iovino (born 1983), American stock car racing driver
- Sandro Iovino (born 1939), Italian actor
- Serenella Iovino, Italian philosopher, and cultural and literary theorist
