= Michael Branch =

Michael Branch may refer to:

- Michael Branch (academic) (1940–2019), British linguist and academic administrator
- Michael Branch (footballer) (born 1978), English footballer
- Mike Branch (born 1965), Louisiana state senator
- Michael P. Branch (born 1963), American ecocritic, writer, and humorist
