= The Goose (magazine) =

- Editors-in-chief: Rina Garcia Chua, Rachel Webb Jekanowski, Jessica McDonald
- Categories: Literary magazine
- Frequency: Biannual
- Company: Wilfrid Laurier University
- Country: Canada
- Language: English
- Website: scholars.wlu.ca/thegoose/
- ISSN: 2291-0948
- OCLC: 1198296151

The Goose is a biannual Canadian literary magazine published by Wilfrid Laurier University's Association for Literature, Environment, and Culture in Canada (ALECC). It has an "emphasis on regional specificity and the promotion of Canadian literature, arts, and environments" and "serves as a forum to counter broad cultural assumptions about North America." The editors-in-chief are Rina Garcia Chua (Simon Fraser University), Rachel Webb Jekanowski (Memorial University), and Jessica McDonald (University of Saskatchewan).

== History ==
The magazine had its origins with the 2005 conference of the Association for the Study of Literature and Environment (ASLE), which spurred the formation of a Canadian chapter of the association, with The Goose as the organization's flagship publication.

Although ASLE-Canada started as an informal listserv network coordinated by the University of Calgary, it has been argued that the 2005 ASLE conference is what primarily spurred the growth of ALECC and by extension, The Goose. Catriona Sandilands, Pamela Banting, and Stephanie Posthumus have been named as "three figures who were instrumental in bringing these meetings together".

== Association for Literature, Environment & Culture in Canada ==
The Canadian chapter of ASLE was initially named ASLE-Canada before it was renamed the Association for Literature, Environment & Culture in Canada (ALECC).

== Editors-in-chief ==
The following persons are or have been editor-in-chief:

- Lisa Szabo-Jones: (2006-2016)
- Paul Huebener: (2007-2017)
- Amanda Di Battista: (2013-2020)
- Melanie Dennis Unrau (2017-2020)
- Alec Follett (2017–present)
- Siobhan Angus (2020–present)
- David Huebert (2020–present)

== See also ==
- List of literary magazines
