= Imagining Extinction =

2016 book by Ursula K. Heise

- Author: Ursula K. Heise
- Language: English
- Genre: Conservation; ethics; literary studies
- Published: August 2016
- Publisher: University of Chicago Press
- Publication date: August 2016
- Pages: 288
- ISBN: 9780226358024
- OCLC: 930364335

Imagining Extinction: The Cultural Meanings of Endangered Species is a 2016 book by Ursula K. Heise. Centered on the influence of cultural values on the uneven prioritization of species in conservation, it explores conservation through the lens of narrative forms, before shifting towards political and philosophical intersections with the subject. Throughout the book, media like literature, film, and art are analyzed to explore the topic. The book received praise for adequately addressing cultural differences and advancing conversations, as well as comparisons to other similar books, but drew criticism for the incomplete nature of its scope.

== Contents ==
Imagining Extinction centers on the influence of cultural values on the prioritization of certain species in biodiversity conservation. It is divided into six chapters which appear following the introduction chapter, titled "Introduction: From the End of Nature to the Beginning of the Anthropocene". The first three and last three chapters each thematically form two separate parts of the book:

- The first half is centered on "concrete cultural engagements with endangered species". "Lost Dogs, Last Birds, and Listed Species: Elegy and Comedy in Conservation Stories" analyzes how literary genres like tragedy and elegy result in aesthetical inequities of species prioritizations. "From Arks to ARKive.org: Database, Epic, and Biodiversity" explores massive biodiversity catalogues, including their nature as a cross between Enlightenment-era encyclopedism and Franco Moretti's "modern epic" concept, as well as the narrative and elegy-like attributes of databases. "The Legal Lives of Endangered Species: Biodiversity Laws and Culture" stretches the subject to academic institutions and legal frameworks.
- The second half focuses on political and philosophical intersections with the idea of endangered species. "Mass Extinction and Mass Slaughter: Biodiversity, Violence, and the Dangers of Domestication" examines the differences of animal welfare activism and environmentalism in contrasted to their shared goals. "Biodiversity, Environmental Justice, and Multispecies Communities" and "Multispecies Fictions for the Anthropocene" propose "multispecies justice" as a way to connect between conservationism and environmental justice, as well as a solution to the debate on the Anthropocene era question. The latter chapter also explores the importance of the science fiction genre in connecting with that concept.

Following the chapters, the book heads to the concluding section "Coda: The Hug of the Polar Bear".

In this book, Heise argues that endangered species have an uneven degree of attention where "invertebrates get much less attention, and plants especially get ignored", and that many concepts of biodiversity and extinction rely on culturally-driven concepts of "nature" and "species". She relies on media analysis to support the latter idea; media analyzed in this book include films, novels, poems, music, and photography, as well as legal frameworks and scientific media. Nicole Merola and Daniel Williams agree that the book provides convincing "templates" for extinction-centered narratives throughout numerous mediums. Themes explored in the book also include "postcolonial ecocriticism ... toxic discourse [and] risk society".

== Production ==
Heise relied on funding from her 2011 Guggenheim Fellowship and a 2014-2015 Andrew W. Mellon Foundation Sawyer Seminar to produce the book, as well as feedback from a 2012 Max Planck Institute for the History of Science endangerment workshop and the University of California, Davis' Environmental Humanities Workshop. She reprinted an expanded version of a 2010 article she wrote for Configurations, with permission from its publisher Johns Hopkins University Press. Her partner Jon Christensen assisted in editing the book.

Imagining Extinction was published in August 2016. It has 288 pages, as well as three color plates, thirteen halftone plates, and two tables. The book is printed in a 6 x 9 format.

== Reception ==
Imagining Extinction received praise from several reviewers. Jan Baetens praised the book for "tak[ing] into account both general principles and context-sensitivity" despite being "extremely careful in discarding all monolithic interpretation or ecocritical radicalism". University of Birmingham professor John Holmes said that the book was "a crisp, consistently intelligent study" that focuses on how to manage cultural differences surrounding biodiversity, but said "the price to pay for Heise's critical sophistication is that it inevitably makes a hard problem seem harder still." Williams called it "an eloquent text, remarkable in its cultural and geographic range, spirited in its polemics, and evincing Heise's peculiar gift for making objects and texts across the spectrum dazzle with equivalent interest". Jeffrey V. Yule praised the book for advancing conversations on addressing the biodiversity crisis instead of concluding outright, but criticized its scope for not covering Blade Runner - despite offering "one of cinema’s more compelling considerations of vertebrate extinction" - or a sufficient amount of scientific articles even when centered on several extinction events. Amy A. Free felt convinced by the idea of prioritizing the cultural part of endangered species over scientific, but showed concern that more questions were being asked by the book than answered.

Colin Dickey drew comparisons to Helen Pilcher's book Bring Back the King, remarking that Imagining Extinction expands on the former's extinction themes by addressing both the root causes behind extinction debates and the difficulties of holistic environmentalism. Similarly, Merola compared the book to others with a shared "capaciousness of current environmental humanities practice and the growth of ecocriticism from its origins examining Anglo-American nature writing". (Note: The other books being Stacy Alaimo's Exposed: Environmental Politics and Pleasures in Posthuman Times (2016), Kate Rigby's Dancing with Disaster: Environmental Histories, Narratives, and Ethics for Perilous Times (2015), Molly Wallace's Risk Criticism: Precautionary Reading in an Age of Environmental Uncertainty (2016).)

Imagining Extinction won the 2016 British Society for Literature and Science Book Prize.
