= Eco-cosmopolitanism =

Eco-cosmopolitanism is a framework developed by Ursula K. Heise in her 2008 book Sense of Place and Sense of Planet. It concerns how local systems related to culture and ecology exist on the global scale, and how one's sense of place is related to the concepts of environmental imaginations, deterritorialization, and globalization. It is a critique of how localism is inadequate at explaining how humans affect nature, how they understand their surroundings, and what to do about the future of the environment in an ethical context. Instead of thinking of environmental problems and one's place in the world through their community, it is about thinking of “Indigenous traditions, local knowledge, or national law” in the context of the planet as a whole. It can also be considered a proposed alternative to anti-globalization and regional, grassroots movements. Heise argues that we are all undeniably connected in the modern age, so any solution that is feasible must account for this on the fundamental level. In relation to the world's ecosystems, the theory complements the idea that ecosystems do not exist as isolates, they instead overlap because globally, they face similar if not the exact same problems. Thus, Heise theorizes, humans have a duty to all ecosystems, not just the one that they are a part of.

The origin of the term is "eco", as in related to the environment, and "cosmopolitan", which is thinking of humans as individual citizens of the world rather than having obligations solely within national boundaries. In the past, cosmopolitanism has been critiqued for being associated with “Western, elitist” ways of thought, so by renaming it Heise seeks to distinguish her framework from this one. The ideas of eco-cosmopolitanism can also be traced to overarching ideas related to traditional ecological knowledge, in which it is argued that local knowledge, stories, and skills have always been modes of understanding how global systems work. Senior (2014), in studying a breadth of Indigenous knowledge, has found indication that some traditional ecological knowledge is rooted in the fact that communities owe support to one another as well as to offer a defense for life-sustaining systems beyond the local scale

== Critiques ==
Hu Zhihong, a scholar of ecocriticism, argues that the idea of a sense of planet is used as a tool for high income countries to further their own environmental solutions, or even as “tools for ecological exploitation, environmental racism, and colonialism”. Conversely, he states that sense of place is a means of local cultural preservation at the hands of transnational exploitation. Additionally, it is said that low income countries do not have the capacity to think about ecological issues on the global scale due to the prioritization of basic necessities.

== Policy Applications ==
The eco-cosmopolitan framework applies to policy in that it argues that in order to address environmental problems, humans have to consider the global nature of environmental risk in terms of how local environmental problems are coupled with global environmental problems, and how they can be simultaneously solved. Paul G. Harris applies the framework to climate change policy in his 2011 "Reconceptualizing Global Governance.". According to Harris, a feasible governance plan for combating climate change uses nations as the vehicles for promoting global justice, rather than representatives of the needs of their own. It also places responsibility for action not based on national GDP or emissions, but rather on affluent individuals of the world to be bringers of global justice to others. Lastly, it argues for human rights being integrated into international level climate agreements on the fundamental level to promote the idea that global justice can be reached if boundaries of nations are ignored when dealing with cross-cutting issues such as climate change.
