= Joni Adamson =

American literary theorist and environmental humanist

19th President of the Association for the Study of Literature and Environment
- In office 2012
- Preceded by: Ursula Heise
- Succeeded by: Paul Outka

Personal details
- Profession: Academic

Joni Adamson (born 1958) is an American literary and cultural theorist. She is considered one of the main proponents of ecocriticism. She is a professor of environmental humanities and senior sustainability scholar at Arizona State University. In 2012, she served as president of the Association for the Study of Literature and Environment (ASLE). From 1999 to 2011, she founded and led the Environment and Culture Caucus of the American Studies Association (ASA-ECC).

== Work ==
American ecocritic Lawrence Buell writes that Adamson's work in American Indian Literature, Environmental Justice, and Ecocriticism: The Middle Place (University of Arizona Press, 2001) and The Environmental Justice Reader: Politics, Poetics, and Pedagogy (co-edited with Rachel Stein and Mei Mei Evans, University of Arizona Press, 2002) should be seen as a major critical intervention in early ecocriticism because it raised the “challenge of eco-justice revisionism” and catalyzed a "second wave" in the field. These books document the efforts of environmental justice groups around the world to organize and mobilize to take charge of their own communities and environments. What sets The Environmental Justice Reader apart from other ecocritical field genealogies, and lays the foundation for Adamson's later co-edited collections, American Studies, Eco-criticism, and Citizenship and Eco-criticism and Indigenous Studies, is an insistence that theory can be produced outside the academy.

Joni Adamson
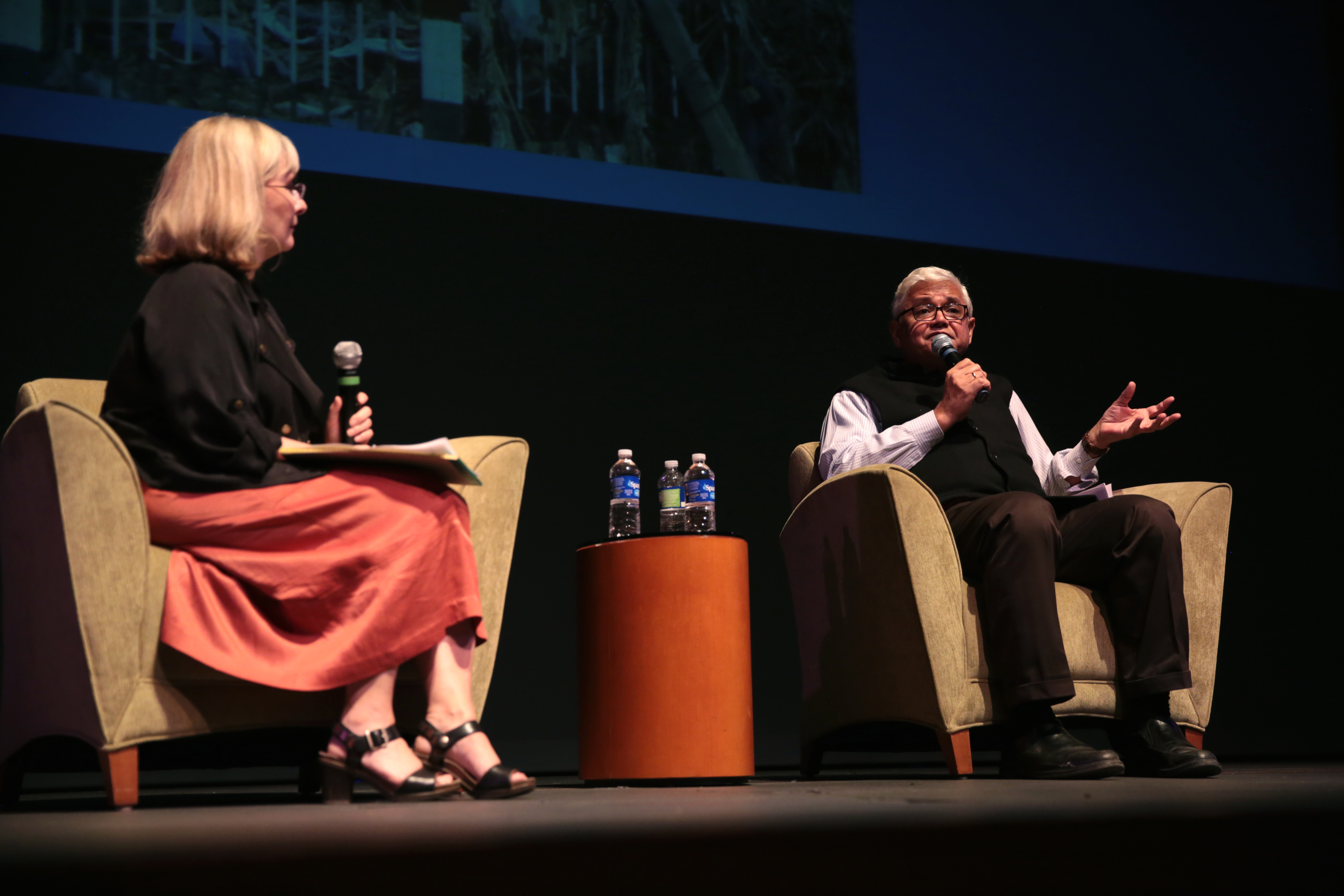
- Joni Adamson with Amitav Ghosh speaking on "War, Race and Empire in the Anthropocene." Tempe, Arizona 2017.

Adamson's work is widely cited in the fields of ecocriticism, environmental justice critical studies, and Native American studies. Her publications focus on global Indigenous peoples, Southwestern American borderlands and the Sonoran Desert, ranching and grasslands, food sovereignty and the food justice movement, and multi-species ethnography. In a 2015 story in The Guardian, Adamson's research on Indigenous cultures and "how the past informs the present and the future" might be employed to "make desert cities into more sustainable ecosystems" was described as "groundbreaking" and "life-changing," and cited as an example of why humanities research should be better known.

Adamson has contributed to the environmental humanities by exploring emerging methodological approaches, particularly multi-species ethnography and Indigenous cosmopolitics. Her early publications, including "Why Bears Are Good to Think" (1992), began laying the groundwork for these approaches by focusing on "more-than-human" or "transformational" characters from Indigenous oral traditions that she argues should be taken seriously as Indigenous scientific literacies, rather than as myths. Stories about these characters, Adamson argues, could be considered theory in the sense that they allow modern peoples to see valid responses to an increasingly complex and chaotic world. Building on the work of symbolic anthropologists and cultural theorists such as Claude Levi-Strauss and Barbara A. Babcock, Adamson concludes that bears, bearwalkers, and other figures from these oral traditions are "good to think."

Adamson's more recent publications build on the work of scholars such as Deborah Bird Rose and Donna Haraway to flesh out the notion of multispecies relationships as represented in literature and film. Adamson also explores how Indigenous activists and communities reference "Indigenous cosmovisions" in their calls for rights for bodies of water and plants. Her writing on these topics discusses international documents such as the United Nations Declaration on the Rights of Indigenous Peoples, Universal Declaration on the Rights of Mother Earth, and 2008 Ecuador constitution.

From 1999 to 2011, Adamso founded and led the Environment and Culture Caucus of the American Studies Association (ASA-ECC). In 2012, she served as president of the Association for the Study of Literature and Environment (ASLE). She has been a professor at Arizona State University since 2006.

== Publications ==
- Adamson, Joni; Davis, Michael, eds. (2017). Humanities for the Environment: Integrating Knowledge, Forging New Constellations of Practice. Routledge. ISBN 978-1-138-18816-7.
- Adamson, Joni; Monani, Salma, eds. (2017). Ecocriticism and Indigenous Studies: Conversations from Earth to Cosmos. New York: Routledge. ISBN 978-1-138-90297-8.
- Adamson, Joni; Gleason, William A.; Pellow, David N., eds. (2016). Keywords for Environmental Studies. New York University Press. ISBN 978-0-8147-6296-7.
- Adamson, Joni; Ruffin, Kimberly N., eds. (2013). American Studies, Ecocriticism, and Citizenship: Thinking and Acting in the Local and Global Commons. New York: Routledge. ISBN 978-0-415-62823-5.
- Adamson, Joni; Evans, Mei Mei; Stein, Rachel, eds. (2005). The Environmental Justice Reader: Politics, Poetics, and Pedagogy. University of Arizona Press. ISBN 978-0-8165-2207-1.
- Adamson, Joni (2001). American Indian Literature, Environmental Justice, and Ecocriticism: The Middle Place. University of Arizona Press. ISBN 978-0-8165-1791-6.
