= Michael P. Branch =

American ecocritic, writer and humorist

3rd President of the Association for the Study of Literature and Environment
- In office 1995–1996
- Preceded by: Scott Slovic
- Succeeded by: John Tallmadge

Personal details
- Born: December 6, 1963 (age 62)
- Citizenship: American
Michael P. Branch
- Occupations: Professor at University of Nevada, Reno
- Known for: Creative Nonfiction, Humor, Ecocriticism
Academic work
- Discipline: American literature
- Sub-discipline: Ecocriticism, film studies, creative nonfiction, humor studies
- Notable works: How to Cuss in Western, 'The Best Read Naturalist': Nature Writings of Ralph Waldo Emerson
- Notable ideas: Humor in Environmental Thinking
- Website: http://michaelbranchwriter.com/

Michael P. Branch (born December 6, 1963) is an ecocritic, writer, and humorist with over three hundred publications, including work in The Best American Essays, The Best American Science and Nature Writing and The Best American Nonrequired Reading. An important member of the environmental and writing community, Western American Literature has described him as part of the "enduring procession of outdoor journalists."

His academic work has been called by reviewers as "an excellent entry to the field for the student or general reader who may have read considerably in the area but who is only beginning to make his or her way around the academic study of nature writing". The Best Read Naturalist was called "[a] much needed and thorough collection of Emerson's most significant nature writings."

When not writing, Branch enjoys activist and stewardship work, native plant gardening, bucking stovewood, playing blues harmonica, sipping sour mash, cursing at baseball on the radio, and walking at least 1,000 miles each year in the hills and canyons surrounding his high desert home.

== Education and work ==
Michael Branch received a Bachelor of Arts from the College of William & Mary in 1985. He received a Master of Arts and Doctor of Philosophy from the University of Virginia. He currently teaches undergraduate and graduate courses at the University of Nevada, Reno, where he is University Foundation Professor of English.

One of the founders of ecocriticism, Branch co-founded the Association for the Study of Literature and Environment (ASLE) and served as the president from 1995 to 1996. He also worked as book review editor for the journal Interdisciplinary Studies in Literature and Environment and co-edited the series Under the Sign of Nature published by The University of Virginia Press.

His professional memberships include the Sierra Club, Wilderness Society, Nature Conservancy, Friends of the Everglades, Sierra Nevada Alliance, League to Save Lake Tahoe, Friends of Nevada Wilderness, Great Basin Mine Watch, Cenozoic Society's Wildlands Project, John Muir Society, Modern Language Association, American Association of University Professors, American Literature Association, American Society for Environmental History.

== Writing career ==
Branch's writing career spans from academic articles to humor essays. His column for High Country News "Rants from the Hill" included 69 essays from 2010 to 2016, which were then collected into two books, Raising Wild and Rants from the Hill. With over 200 publications and 300 invited talks, lectures, and workshops, Branch's work has aided in founding ecocriticism. A selection of his work in ecocriticism includes:

- "Are You Serious? A Modest Proposal for Environmental Humor." Oxford Handbook of Ecocriticism (edited by Greg Garrard), Oxford University Press, 2014: 378–90.
- "An Ecocritical Community." Journal of Ecocriticism 5.1 (January, 2013): 3–4. Literature and Environment, the Long View: Thoughts from the Founders of ASLE
- "Saving All the Pieces: The Place of Textual Editing in Ecocriticism." The Greening of Literary Scholarship: Literature, Theory, and the Environment (edited by Steven Rosendale), University of Iowa Press, 2002: 3-25.
- "Ecocriticism: The Nature of Nature in Literary Theory and Practice." Weber Studies: An Interdisciplinary Humanities Journal 11.1 (Winter, 1994): 41–55.

A selection of his work in creative nonfiction includes:

- "Pilgrimage to the Pointy-Toed Boots." Terrain.org: A Journal of the Built and Natural Environments. June 25, 2019.
- "Will the Real Fake John Muir Please Stand Up?" Sustainable Play: Long-form Storytelling at the Confluence of People, Planet, and Play. August 8, 2018.
- "Finding Home: What Happens When a Desert Baby Visits the Meadows of Yosemite?" National Parks Magazine 91.3 (June, 2017): 18–20.
- "Lawn Guilt." Terrain.org: A Journal of the Built and Natural Environments. June 20, 2017.
- "Big Dan, a Couple of Beers, and Thousands of Honeybees." High Country News 49.10 (June 12, 2017): 26–27.
- "The Hills are Alive." Places Journal. January, 2012. (12 ms. pp.)
- "Freebirds: A Thanksgiving Lesson in Forgiveness." Orion 30.6 (November/December, 2011): 44–49. Also available as a studio-recorded podcast of an author reading of the essay.
- "The Adventures of Peavine and Charlie: A Journey through the Imaginative Landscape of Childhood." Orion 30.1 (January/February, 2011): 58–63. Also available as a studio-recorded podcast of an author reading of the essay.

The Michael P. Branch Papers are curated in the Special Collections and University Archives, University of Nevada, Reno. Established in 2014. 44 boxes to date. (Collection Identifier #2014-05).

=== Creative nonfiction ===
- On the Trail of the Jackalope: How a Legend Captured the World's Imagination and Helped Us Cure Cancer. Pegasus Books, 2022. ISBN 1643139339 (hardcover).
- How to Cuss in Western: And Other Missives from the High Desert. Shambhala / Roost Books (distributed by Penguin Random House), 2018. ISBN 9781611804614 (paperback).
- Rants from the Hill: On Packrats, Bobcats, Wildfires, Curmudgeons, a Drunken Mary Kay Lady, and Other Encounters with the Wild in the High Desert. Shambhala / Roost Books (distributed by Penguin Random House), 2017. ISBN 978-1611804577 (paperback); ISBN 9780834840553 (E-book).
- Raising Wild: Dispatches from a Home in the Wilderness. Shambhala Publications / Roost Books (distributed by Penguin Random House). 2016. ISBN 978-1-61180-345-7 (cloth).

=== Academic books ===
- 'The Best Read Naturalist': Nature Writings of Ralph Waldo Emerson. Co-editor with Clinton Mohs. University of Virginia Press, 2017. ISBN 9780813939513 (cloth); ISBN 9780813939520 (paper); ISBN 9780813939537 (E-book).
- John Muir's Last Journey: South to the Amazon and East to Africa; Unpublished Journals and Selected Correspondence, editor. Foreword by Robert Michael Pyle. Washington, D.C.: Island Press/Shearwater Books, 2001. ISBN 1-55963-640-8 (cloth); ISBN 9781559636407 (paper); ISBN 9781559636407 (E-book). Audiobook released by Audible Studios in 2016 (Reader: Allan Robertson).
- Reading the Roots: American Nature Writing before Walden. Athens and London: University of Georgia Press, 2004. ISBN 0-8203-2547-3 (cloth); ISBN 0-8203-2548-1 (paper).
- The ISLE Reader: Ecocriticism, 1993–2003. Co-editor with Scott Slovic. Foreword by Patrick D. Murphy. Athens and London: University of Georgia Press, 2003. ISBN 0-8203-2516-3 (cloth); ISBN 0-8203-2517-1 (paper).
- Reading the Earth: New Directions in the Study of Literature and the Environment. Co-editor with Rochelle Johnson, Daniel Patterson, and Scott Slovic. Moscow: University of Idaho Press, 1998. ISBN 0-89301-213-0 (cloth); ISBN 0-89301-220-3 (paper).
- The Height of Our Mountains: Nature Writing from Virginia's Blue Ridge Mountains and Shenandoah Valley. Co-editor with Daniel J. Philippon. Foreword by John Elder. Baltimore and London: Johns Hopkins University Press, 1998. ISBN 0-8018-5632-9 (cloth); ISBN 0-8018-5691-4 (paper).

== Honors and awards ==
- 2024 Nevada Writers Hall of Fame Inductee
- Rants from the Hill chosen as finalist for the Association for the Study of Literature and Environment Creative Book Award
- 2017 Ellen Meloy Desert Writers Award
- Nevada Writers Hall of Fame Silver Pen Award
- Raising Wild chosen as finalist for the Association for the Study of Literature and Environment Creative Book Award
- The Best Read Naturalist listed by Chicago Review of Books as among "The Best Nature Writing of 2017"
- Western Literature Association Frederick Manfred Award for Creative Writing
- "Ghosts Chasing Ghosts: Pronghorn and the Long Shadow of Evolution" received Honorable Mention for the Pushcart Prize and listed as a "Notable Essay" in The Best American Science and Nature Writing, 2009
