= Ursula K. Heise =

German philosopher and literary scholar

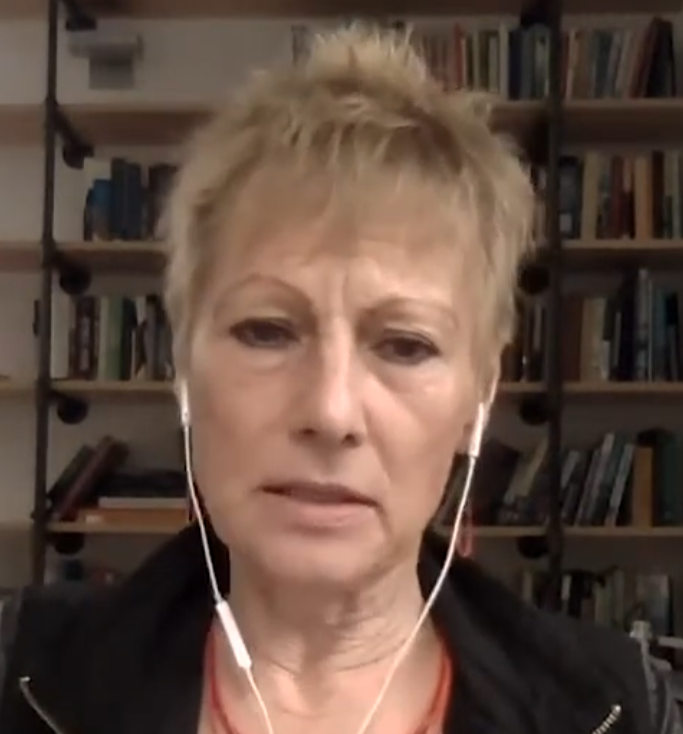
- Heise in 2020

President of the Association for the Study of Literature and Environment
- In office 2011–2012

Personal details
- Born: 1960 (age 65–66) Koblenz, Rhineland-Palatinate, West Germany
- Education: University of Cologne; Stanford University (PhD)
- Occupation: Philosopher; literary scholar
- Awards: Guggenheim Fellowship (2011); Fellow of the American Academy of Arts and Sciences (2026)

Academic background
- Thesis: Chronoschisms: Temporality and Contingency in Postmodern Narrative (1993)
- Doctoral advisor: Shirley Brice Heath

Academic work
- Sub-discipline: Environmental humanities; Postmodernism
- Institutions: Columbia University; Stanford University; University of California, Los Angeles

Ursula Brigitte Katrina Heise (born 1960) is a German environmental philosopher and literary scholar. Originally a literary scholar, she became interested in environmental humanities after going birdwatching at Central Park, and has written a few books in the field including Sense of Place and Sense of Planet (2008) and Imagining Extinction (2016). She is Distinguished Professor and Marcia H. Howard Chair in Literary Studies at the University of California, Los Angeles. She was a 2011 Guggenheim Fellow and served as president of the Association for the Study of Literature and Environment that same year. She was elected Fellow of the American Academy of Arts and Sciences in 2026.

== Biography ==
Heise was born in 1960 in Koblenz, West Germany into a family she once said was "not particularly nature-oriented". She studied at the University of Cologne and Stanford University, the latter where she got her PhD in English and American literature. Her doctoral dissertation Chronoschisms: Temporality and Contingency in Postmodern Narrative (1993) was supervised by Shirley Brice Heath. In 1997, she published Chronoschisms: Time, Narrative and Postmodernism, which explores the workings of plot in the postmodern novel.

Heise starting going birdwatching at Central Park with others after her experiences of buying a pet parrot; this inspired her to shift to the environmental humanities. She authored Sense of Place and Sense of Planet (2008), which argues for the idea of eco-cosmopolitanism as an important part of environmental ethics similar to the sense of place, and Imagining Extinction (2016), where she concludes that endangered species have an uneven degree of attention where "invertebrates get much less attention, and plants especially get ignored". She also published a German-language book, Nach der Natur: Das Artensterben und die moderne Kultur on 17 November 2010. In May 2015, she was interviewed by Los Angeles Times journalist Carla Rivera about Los Angeles' presence in science fiction.

Heise originally worked at Columbia University as an associate professor of English and comparative literature from 1999 to 2004, before moving to Stanford University where she was a professor of English and comparative literature from 2009 to 2012. She was president of the Association for the Study of Literature and Environment in 2011. In 2016, she became the Marcia H. Howard Term Chair in Literary Studies at the University of California, Los Angeles, the first to hold the position. She served as International Francqui Professor Chair at Ghent University from September to December 2024.

In 2011, Heise was awarded a Guggenheim Fellowship. In 2024, she won the Biophilia Award in Environmental Humanities and Social Sciences. She was elected Fellow of the American Academy of Arts and Sciences in 2026.

== Works ==
- Chronoschisms: Time, Narrative and Postmodernism (1997) (Note: Reviews of this book:)
- Sense of Place and Sense of Planet: The Environmental Imagination of the Global (2008) (Note: Reviews of this book:)
- Nach der Natur: Das Artensterben und die moderne Kultur (2010)
- Imagining Extinction: The Cultural Meanings of Endangered Species (2016)
