= Association for the Study of Literature and Environment =

American professional association formed in 1992

- Abbreviation: ASLE
- Pronunciation: Az-lee
- Formation: 9 October 1992 (33 years ago)
- Founder: Cheryll Glotfelty; Michael P. Branch & others
- Founded at: Reno, Nevada, United States
- Type: Nonprofit organization Professional association Scholarly association
- Tax ID no.: 54-1640944 Affiliated organizations American Literature Association; American Studies Association; Association for the Study of American Indian Literatures; Association of Writers & Writing Programs; Disciplinary Associations' Network for Sustainability; The Louisville Conference on Literature and Culture Since 1900; Modern Language Association; Midwest Modern Language Association; Northeast Modern Language Association; Pacific Ancient and Modern Language Association; Rocky Mountain Modern Language Association; South Atlantic Modern Language Association; Science Fiction Research Association; Society of Early Americanists; Society for Ecocriticism Studies in Japan; Society for Literature, Science, and the Arts; Society for the Study of American Women Writers; Thoreau Society; Western Literature Association International branches ALECC (Canada); ASLEC-ANZ (Australia – New Zealand); ASLE-J (Japan); ASLE-Brasil (Brazil); ASLE-Korea; EASLCE (Europe); ASLE-Taiwan; ASLE-UKI (UK and Ireland); ASLE-ASEAN (ASEAN) tiNai (India); ASLE-Pakistan
- Headquarters: Keene, New Hampshire, United States
- Region served: International
- Fields: ecocriticism environmental humanities
- Members: 1,450 (2019)
- Managing Director: Amy M. McIntyre (2004-present)
- Publication: Interdisciplinary Studies in Literature and Environment (ISLE)
- Website: www.asle.org

The Association for the Study of Literature and Environment (ASLE), also known as ASLE-USA, is the principal professional association for American and international scholars of ecocriticism and environmental humanities. It was founded in 1992 at a special session of the Western Literature Association conference in Reno, Nevada for the purpose of "sharing of facts, ideas, and texts concerning the study of literature and the environment."

The association hosts a biennial conference since 1995, alternating with symposia in non-conference years.

ASLE's journal is Interdisciplinary Studies in Literature and Environment (ISLE), a quarterly published by Oxford University Press, in which the most current scholarship in the rapidly evolving field of environmental humanities can often be found.

== ASLE Presidents, Conferences and Symposia ==
This is a list of people who have served as presidents of ASLE since its inception in 1992. The biennial conferences/symposia held during their tenure are given along.

#	President	Year(s)	Affiliation	Biennial Conference (Dates)	Symposium (Dates)	Theme	Venue
1	Scott Slovic	1992-93					
(1) 2	Scott Slovic	1993-94	University of Tokyo				
(1) 2	Cheryll Glotfelty	1993-94	University of Nevada, Reno				
(1)	Scott Slovic	1994-95	University of Nevada, Reno	I (9-11 June 1995)	-		Colorado State University
3	Michael P. Branch	1995-96	University of Nevada, Reno		I (13-17 August 1996)	Japanese and American Environmental Literature	University of Hawaii
4	John Tallmadge	1997	Union Institute & University, Cincinnati	II (17-19 July)	-	The Last Best Place	University of Montana
5	Louise Westling	1998	University of Oregon	-	-	-	-
6	Walter Isle	1999	Rice University	III (2-5 June )	-	What to Make of a diminished thing: Restoration, Preservation, Conservation	Western Michigan University
7	SueEllen Campbell	2000	Colorado State University	-	II (15-17 June)	Food and Farming in American Life and Letters	Unity College (Maine)
8	Randall Roorda	2001	University of Kentucky	-	III (4-6 January)	Desert Crossings	Big Bend National Park
8	Randall Roorda	2001	University of Kentucky	IV (19-23 June)	-	Making a Start Out of Particulars	Big Bend National Park
8	Randall Roorda	2001	University of Kentucky	IV (19-23 June)	-	Making a Start Out of Particulars	Northern Arizona University
8	Randall Roorda	2001	University of Kentucky	-	IV (24-27 October )	“Coming Nearer the Ground”: An ASLE Symposium on the South	University of Mississippi
9	Terrell F. Dixon	2002	University of Houston	-			
10	Ian Marshall	2003		V (3-7 June)	-	The Solid Earth! The Actual World!: Sea–City–Pond–Garden	Boston University
11	John Elder	2004	Middlebury College	-	V (4-6 June)	Nature and Culture in the Northern Forest	The Highland Center, Crawford Notch, New Hampshire
11	John Elder	2004	Middlebury College	-	VI (23-25 September )	Globalization and the Environmental Justice Movement	University of Arizona, Tucson
12	Allison Wallace	2005	Honors College, University of Central Arkansas	VI (21-25 June)	-	Being in the World, Living With the Land	University of Oregon
13	Ann Fisher-Wirth	2006	University of Mississippi	-	VII (2-4 June )	Maine’s Place in the Environmental Imagination	University of Maine at Farmington
14	Karla Armbruster	2007	Webster University	VII (12-16 June)	-	Confluence: literature, art, criticism, science, activism, politics.	Wofford College
15	Rochelle Johnson	2008	College of Idaho	-			
16	Daniel J. Philippon	2009	University of Minnesota	VIII (3-6 June)	-	Island Time: The Fate of Place in a Wired, Warming World	University of Victoria
17	Annie Ingram	2010			VIII (18-20 June)	The Third Annual Rural Heritage Institute: Is Local Enough? Promises and Limits of Local Action	Sterling College, Craftsbury Common, Vermont
18	Ursula K. Heise	2011	Stanford University	IX (21-26 June)	-	Species, Space and the Imagination of the Global	Indiana University, Bloomington
19	Joni Adamson	2012	Arizona State University	-	IX (14-17 June)	Environment, Culture & Place in a Rapidly Changing North	University of Alaska Southeast
20	Paul Outka	2013	University of Kansas	X ( 28 May – 1 June)	-	Changing Nature: Migrations, Energies, Limits	University of Kansas
21	Mark C. Long	2014	Keene State College	-			
22	Catriona Sandilands	2015	York University	XI (23-27 June)	-	Notes From Underground: The Depths of Environmental Arts, Culture and Justice	University of Idaho
23	Christoph Irmscher	2016-17	Indiana University, Bloomington		XI (7-9 June 2016)	Sharp Eyes IX: Local, Regional, Global: The Many Faces of Nature Writing	State University of New York College at Oneonta
23	Christoph Irmscher	2016-17	Indiana University, Bloomington		XII (8-11 June 2016)	The Heart Of The Gila: Wilderness And Water In The West	Western New Mexico University
23	Christoph Irmscher	2016-17	Indiana University, Bloomington		XIII (21-22 Oct 2016)	Toxic Borders And Bondages: Intersecting Ecology With Capitalism, Racism, Heteropatriarchy And (Dis)Possession (Graduate Symposium)	University of Michigan, Ann Arbor
23	Anthony Lioi	2016-17	Juilliard School		XIII (21-22 Oct 2016)	Toxic Borders And Bondages: Intersecting Ecology With Capitalism, Racism, Heteropatriarchy And (Dis)Possession (Graduate Symposium)	University of Michigan, Ann Arbor
23	Anthony Lioi	2016-17	Juilliard School	XII (20-24 June 2017)		Rust/Resistance: Works of Recovery	Wayne State University
24	Stacy Alaimo	Jan 2018: Dec 2019	University of Texas at Arlington (2010-March 2019); University of Oregon (September 2019-)	-	XIV (14-30 June 2018)	A Clockwork Green: Ecomedia In The Anthropocene	A Nearly Carbon Neutral Virtual Symposium. Co-Sponsored with the University of California, Santa Barbara
24	Stacy Alaimo	Jan 2018: Dec 2019	University of Texas at Arlington (2010-March 2019); University of Oregon (September 2019-)	XIII (26-30 June 2019)		Paradise on Fire	University of California, Davis
24	Jeffrey Cohen	Jan 2018: Dec 2019	University of Texas at Arlington (2010-March 2019); University of Oregon (September 2019-)	XIII (26-30 June 2019)		Paradise on Fire	University of California, Davis
24	Jeffrey Cohen	Jan 2018: Dec 2019	Arizona State University	XIII (26-30 June 2019)		Paradise on Fire	University of California, Davis
25	Laura Barbas-Rhoden	2020-2021	Wofford College				
25	Bethany Wiggin	2020-2021	University of Pennsylvania				
26	Gisela Heffes	2022-23	Rice University				
26	George B. Handley	2022-23	Brigham Young University	N/A	XIV (6-9 July)	-	Oregon Convention Center
27	Amy Hamilton	2024-	Northern Michigan University				
27	Nicole Seymour	2024-	California State University, Fullerton				
