= Nature in children's literature =

Nature is a major theme and symbol in children's literature. The presence and portrayal of the natural world in books, stories, and media created for young audiences is well studied, making a significant part of literary criticism that has been increasingly important with the expansion of Ecocriticism.

The relationship between children and nature has been a persistent subject in literary culture, with growing interest in how these narratives function in educational settings. Because children's literature sets youth expectations about nature, the themes can create life-long habits of mind or understandings, that effect long term environmental education outcomes.

== Defining ecocriticism ==
Ecocriticism is the study of the relationship between literature and the physical world. Furthermore, it is defined as the examination of how nature is represented in literary texts and how those representations reflect broader cultural attitudes toward the environment.

When applied to children's literature specifically, ecocriticism considers how young readers encounter and internalize ideas about nature, animals, landscapes, and environmental responsibility through the stories they read.

== History ==
The application of ecocriticism to children's literature is a relatively recent development in literary scholarship. Sidney Dobrin and Kenneth Kidd's 2004 edited volume Wild Things: Children's Culture and Ecocriticism was the first book to apply ecocritical methods specifically to children's literature and media, opening up the growing field.

However, scholars have traced the figure of the "child in nature" as a long-standing cultural construction in children's texts. The image of the child connected to the natural world carries deep ideological weight, reflecting broader social ideas about innocence, freedom, and belonging and has appeared across children's literature for generations.

== Purpose ==
Environmental education researchers have noted that children's literature functions as an important site for exploring how young people come to understand environments and places. By encountering forests, rivers, animals, and landscapes in stories, children develop emotional and conceptual frameworks for thinking about the natural world before they encounter it directly. Children's texts are not neutral in their portrayals of nature, and the values embedded in these narratives have real consequences for how children relate to the environment as they grow.

Some scholars have argued that the purpose of nature in children's literature today is to support environmental advocacy. Contemporary children's literature frequently gives voice to nature itself, positioning the natural world as a subject with moral claims on the reader rather than simply a setting for human stories.

== Classroom uses ==
The presence of nature in children's literature has attracted increasing attention from educators and researchers interested in environmental education. Research published in Environmental Education Research has highlighted the international relevance of using children's literature as a classroom resource for engaging students with questions about environments, places, and ecological relationships.

Empirical work by Gonen and Guler (2011), drawing on picture story books used in Turkish early childhood settings, found that environmental themes appear with meaningful frequency in children's books and that these themes can be productively integrated into classroom learning.

The Green Dialogues project, documented by Campagnaro (2026), has developed ecocritical pathways specifically designed to bring children's literature into dialogue with environmental education. The project's goal is to formalize the connections between literary study and ecological awareness in school settings, offering frameworks for teachers to use children's texts as tools for environmental learning.
