= Queer ecology =

Environmental approach informed by queer theory

Queer ecology (or queer ecologies) is an interdisciplinary scholarly practice which seeks to combine elements from both ecological criticism and Queer theory. Queer ecology seeks to apply a critical eye to ecological studies by challenging the default heteronormativity present in assumptions of 'objectivity' which feature prominently within traditional ecological research. The practice draws from science studies, ecofeminism, environmental justice, queer epistemology, and geography as it works to reject historic assumptions of 'dual' or 'binary' (e.g.; default assumptions of all species existing in distinct and persistent categories of 'male' and 'female' sexes).

== Overview ==
Queer ecology posits that any and all ideas of "nature" and "natural" must be understood as human perspectives, not inherent properties of matter and being. Queer ecology tasks researchers to reject attempts to understand nature in terms of dualistic notions such as "natural and unnatural", "alive or not alive" or "human or not human." This rejection is motivated by an understanding that all things in nature exist on a continuum of states, rather than in distinct, binary states of being. This extends to the fields rejection of heteronormative constructs in science and social settings, seeking to build a field of ecology based in a practice of radical inclusivity.

Additionally, Queer ecology attempts to reposition ecological studies away from anthropocentric framing that presumes human perspectives as uniquely important and human intelligence as uniquely valid compared to those of non-humans. This re-framing asks practitioners of Queer ecology to actively assign equal or higher value to the lives, experiences, needs, and creations of non-human animals and ecosystems as they would assign to human versions of the same.

Challenging false dualisms and rejecting anthropocentric thinking combine in Queer ecology's focus on actively working to understand all living things as connecting and interrelated. Drawing directly from Queer theory, "to queer" nature means actively embracing the complexities inherent to all studies of nature and to reject assumptions of human interpretation and human activity as "neutral" in any context.

Queer ecologies have been associated with Tara Tabassi's ideas around "dirty resilience" as well as what Sacha Knox describes as "insurgent posthumanism.

== Definition ==
Keywords for Environmental Studies defines "Queer ecology" as

"...a loose, interdisciplinary constellation of practices that aim, in different ways, to disrupt prevailing heterosexist discursive and institutional articulations of sexuality and nature, and also to reimagine evolutionary processes, ecological interactions, and environmental politics in light of queer theory. Drawing from traditions as diverse as evolutionary biology, LGBTTIQQ2SA (lesbian, gay, bisexual, transgender, transsexual, intersex, queer, questioning, two-spirited, and allies) movements, and queer geography and history, feminist science studies, ecofeminism, and environmental justice, queer ecology currently highlights the complexity of contemporary biopolitics, draws important connections between the material and cultural dimensions of environmental issues, and insists on an articulatory practice in which sex and nature are understood in light of multiple trajectories of power and matter." - Catriona Sandilands in Keywords for Environmental Studies (2016)

== History ==
Environmental humanities scholar Catriona Sandilands traces the roots of Queer ecology to Michel Foucault's The History of Sexuality (1976), wherein Foucault describes the way human reproductive biology is used as a default lens for understanding the biologies of non-human animals and even plant-life, despite the inherent and obvious differences between humans and other life forms. Sandiland further connects Queer ecology to Foucault's conceptualization of the "medicine of sex" and his work to differentiate human desire and identity building from concepts related specifically to human biological processes (the "medicine of the body").

In 1990, Judith Butler published their influential book on gender as an act of performativity, Gender Trouble: Feminism and the Subversion of Identity. Their discussion of gender as performance, one which simultaneously creates and reinforces gender as a construction of individuals and society, has been noted as an inspiration for early Queer ecology research. Ecological studies, in this line of thinking, are never simply describing an objective truth of "nature," they are also doing work to call into being categories such as "nature" or "culture" which only exist as human constructs. Ecological research, therefore, performs scientific categorization in the same way individuals perform gender.

Some Queer ecology scholars also see the field as an offshoot of ecofeminism, which emerged in the 1970's and considered the intersections between women and the environment. Additionally, the political philosophy that underpins all Queer ecological thinking has been compared to Murray Bookchin's concept of social ecology.

== Heteronormativity and the environment ==
Queer ecology recognizes that people often associate heteronormativity with the idea of "natural", in contrast to, for example, homosexuality, trans, and non-binary identities, which people generally, under particular structures, associate with the "unnatural". These expectations of sexuality and nature often influence scientific studies of the non-human. The natural world often defies the heteronormative notions held by scientists, helping humans to redefine our cultural understanding of what "natural" is and therefore how we might be able to "queer" environmental spaces. For example, in 'The Feminist Plant: Changing Relations with the Water Lily,' Prudence Gibson and Monica Gagliano explain how the water lily defies heterosexist notions. They argue that because the water lily is so much more than its reputation as a "pure" or "feminine" plant, we need to reevaluate our understanding of plants and acknowledge the connections between plant biology and models for cultural practice, through a feminist lens.

In A Political Ecology of 'Unnatural Offenses,' Kath Weston points out that environmentalism and queer politics rarely seem to intersect, but that "this dislocation rests on a narrow association of ecology with visible landscapes and sexuality with visible bodies bounded by skin." In The Body as Bioregion, Deborah Slicer wrote that "[t]he environmentalists' silence about the body is all too familiar. My worry is that this silence reflects that traditional and dangerous way of thinking that the body is of no consequence, that our own corporeal nature is irrelevant to whatever environmentalists are calling "Nature"." As Nicole Seymour states, "... new models of gender and sexuality emerge not just out of shifts in areas such as politics, economics, and medicine, but out of shifts in ecological consciousness."

In the Orion Magazine article, "How to Queer Ecology: One Goose at a Time," Alex Carr Johnson calls for a stop to the dualistic and generalizing categorization of nature and its possibilities. Johnson emphasizes that human's navigation of sexuality cannot be primarily determined by observation of animal sexual patterns and partnerships. Queer ecology is deemed as fluid and ever-evolving by Johnson, an opportunity to think beyond the biological and reproductive landscapes but to embrace the new. Identifying the queerness of nature such as the bisexuality in red squirrels, Johnson insists that queerness is right outside of your door. Two opposing interpretations are found by comparing David Quammen’s essay “The Miracle of Geese” and Bruce Bagemihl’s book, Biological Exuberance. While Quammen used evidence of monogamous and heterosexual partnerships amongst geese as an ecological mandate for such behaviors, Bagemihl observed monogamous and homosexual partnerships. These partnerships were frequent and persistent, not from a lack of potential mates of the opposite sex. Such conflicting accounts of the “natural” exemplify how interpretation, extrapolation, and communication of nature and the natural subsequently restricts and reduces the capacity to conceptualize and understand what it constitutes.

In another magazine article by Atmos Magazine titled Full Spectrum: Honoring Queerness in Nature, Ben Toms and Robbie Spencer curate a series of queer models interspersed with quotes discussing the freedom of queerness within nature. The article's subtitle states, "For many queer people, nature is a place free of judgment and conformity, where diversity is celebrated and crucial to survival." The continued quotes speak of queer ecology and the embrace of queerness in nature as a form of rebellion, a place of liberation, and a way to keep hope.

Sacha Knox refers to Camille Vidal-Naquet's Sauvage (2018) as a queer ecological film, looking at how queer acts threaten colonial, imperialist, and nationalist ambitions, challenging collaboration in the colonial narratives of race, ability, sex, and gender, through which modern formations of "nature" have been constituted.

== Reimagining scientific perspectives ==
In disciplines of the natural sciences like evolutionary biology and ecology, queer ecology allows scholars to reimagine cultural binaries that exist between "natural and unnatural" and "living and non-living".

Timothy Morton proposes that biology and ecology deconstruct notions of authenticity. Specifically, they propose that life exists as a "mesh of interrelations" that blurs traditional scientific boundaries, like species, living and nonliving, human and nonhuman, and even between an organism and its environment. Queer ecology, according to Morton, emphasizes a perspective on life that transcends dualisms and distinctive boundaries, instead recognizing that unique relationships exist between life forms at different scales. Some studies of queer ecology nuances traditional evolutionary perspectives on sexuality, regarding heterosexuality as impractical at many scales and as a "late" evolutionary development.

Other scholars challenge the contrast that exists between "human" and "non-human" classifications, proposing that the idea of "fluidity" from queer theory should also extend to the relationship between humans and the non-human.

== Queer ecology and human society ==
Queer ecology is also relevant when considering human geography. For example, Catriona Sandilands considers lesbian separatist communities in Oregon as a specific manifestation of queer ecology. Marginalized communities, according to Sandilands, create new cultures of nature against dominant ecological relations. Environmental issues are closely linked to social relations that include sexuality, and so a strong alliance exists between queer politics and environmental politics. "Queer geography" calls attention to the spatial organization of sexuality, which implicates issues of access to natural spaces, and the sexualization of these spaces. This implies that unique ecological relationships arise from these sexuality-based experiences. Furthermore, queer ecology disrupts the association of nature with sexuality. Matthew Gandy proposes that urban parks, for example, are heteronormative because they reflect hierarchies of property and ownership. "Queer", in the case of urban nature, refers to spatial difference and marginalization, beyond sexuality.

Queer ecology is also important within individual households. As a space influenced by society, the home is often an ecology that perpetuates heteronormativity. Will McKeithen examines queer ecology in the home by considering the implications of the label "crazy cat lady". Because the "crazy cat lady" often defies societal heterosexist expectations for the home, as she, instead of having a romantic, cis-male, human partner, treats animals as legitimate companions. This rejection of heteropatriarchal norms and acceptance of multispecies intimacy, creates a queer ecology of the home.

Queer ecology is also connected to feminist economics, concerned with topics such as social reproduction, extractivism, and feminized forms of labour, largely unrecognized and unremunerated by dominant Capitalist, Neo-Colonial and Neo-Imperialist systems. Feminist economics may be said to be using queer ecology, to disentangle the gender binary, including the ties between the cis-female body's reproductive potential and the responsibilities of social reproduction, childcare, and nation building.

== Arts and literature ==
A significant shift towards an ecological aesthetic in New York can be traced back to an interdisciplinary festival in 1990 called the Sex Salon which took place at the art space Epoché in Williamsburg, Brooklyn. Celebrating both nonbinary forms of sexuality and the rooting of culture within a neighborhood ecosystem, the three day salon was the first large gathering of artists, writers and musicians outside the Borough of Manhattan. The ecologically engaged movement, eventually referred to as the Brooklyn Immersionists, included the ecofeminist periodical, The Curse and the night space, El Sensorium, which promoted a form of identity-free abandon.

The Immersionist scene came to a climax in 1993, according to Domus, with the ecological culture experiment, Organism. The event blurred the boundaries between humans and their environment and featured numerous overlapping cultural and natural systems cultivated by 120 members of Williamsburg's creative community. The ecological "web jam" included a genderless "elvin napping system" and a participatory exercise in sexual empowerment called The Boom Boom Womb by the polyamorous rock group, Thrust. The all night event was attended by over 2000 guests and has been cited by Newsweek, the Performing Arts Journal (PAJ), Die Zeit and the New York Times. Organism's program notes invited the audience into an implicitly queer merging of the human body with its ecosystem:

"Wiffle your fingers through the mush. Invite a friend into the jello with you. This is all one strange continuum, a conflux of linkages, systems, feedback loops, waveforms... How do we extract pleasure from such an equation? Can we build a hybrid of steel, brick, plants, [bodies] and thought, absorbing pleasure from it as we ourselves become integrated into its monstrous flesh?"

In May 1994, an editorial essay in UnderCurrents: Journal of Critical Environmental Studies entitled "Queer Nature" spoke to the notion of queer ecology. The piece identified the disruptive power possible when one examines normative categories associated with nature. The piece asserted that white cis-heterosexual males hold power over the politics of nature, and that this pattern cannot continue. Queer Ecological thinking and literature was also showcased in this issue, in the form of poetry and art submissions—deconstructing heteronormativity within both human and environmental sexualities. In 2015, Undercurrents proceeded to release an update to their original issue and a podcast to celebrate 20 years of continued studies in queer ecology.

In 2013, Strange Natures, by Nicole Seymour, explored the queer ecological imagination, futurity, and empathy through culture and popular culture, including the contemporary transgender novel and different forms of cinema.

The use of the moving image also features in other projects dedicated to understanding queer ecologies from a decolonial perspective. One such example is the Amazônia EcoQueer project, funded by the British Academy. This academic research and curatorial initiative organises film screenings, exhibitions and workshops to explore how LGBTQIAPN+ moving image artists from the Brazilian Amazon imagine queer/cuir ecological futures for the region.

Theater is a significant setting for exploring ideas of queer ecology, because the theater-space can provide an alternative environment, from which to consider a reality independent from the socially constructed and enforced, binaries and heteronormativity of the outside world. In this way, theater has the potential to construct temporary "queer ecologies" on stage.

Writers such as Henry David Thoreau, Herman Melville, Willa Cather, and Djuna Barnes, have been said to complicate the common notion that environmental literature consists exclusively of heterosexual doctrine and each of their work sheds light on the ways that human sexuality is connected to environmental politics. Robert Azzarello, has also identified common themes of queerness and environmental studies in American Romantic and post-Romantic literature that challenge conventional ideas of the "natural".

== Queer Ecologies and Crip Theory ==
Giovanna Di Chiro, placing queer ecologies in intimate relation with disability studies, quotes Eli Clare as follows:

"The body as home, but only if it is understood that bodies can be stolen, fed lies and poison, torn away from us. They rise up around me - bodies stolen by hunger, war, breast cancer, AIDS, rape, the daily grind of the factory, sweatshop, cannery, sawmill; the lynching rope; the freezing streets; the nursing home and prison... disabled people cast as supercrips and tragedies; lesbian/gay/bisexual/trans people told over and over again that we are twisted and unnatural; poor people made responsible for their own poverty. Stereotypes and lies lodge in our bodies as surely as bullets. They live and fester there, stealing the body."

Expanding on this, Knox links the work of Clare to queer ecologies, asking - with him - what it means to refigure the world. Clare links queer and disability practitioners' critiques of the compulsions of heterosexuality and able-bodiedness together with activists' redefining of environment as community and home. While those that deviate from the norm may be hated, impoverished, and poisoned, Clare maintains that seeing and knowing from non-normative positions may offer views for imagining new, just, and sustainable ways of living on the earth.

== See also ==
- Bruce Bagemihl
- Mel Y. Chen
- Eli Clare
- Climate justice
- Crip theory
- Donna Haraway
- Queer theory
- Catriona Sandilands
- Sauvage (film)
- Sexecology
- Simondon
- Social ecology
