= Rosemary Georgeson =

Filmmaker

Rosemary Georgeson is a Coast Salish and Sahtu Dene filmmaker and multi-media artist. Georgeson was born on Galiano Island in British Columbia, Canada. Her work ranges from film, theatre, radio to involvement in the culinary arts. Georgeson was the Aboriginal Community Director of Urban Ink Productions 2002–2011, and has worked with the company since its inception in 2001. In 2014 Georgeson was invited to the position of Aboriginal Storyteller in Residence at the Vancouver Public Library. Much of Georgeson's work highlights the unrecorded contributions that Indigenous women have made within the dying fishing industry. Raised in a fishing family on Galiano Island in the Southern gulf islands of British Columbia, Georgeson spent many years working and living on fish boats. An important component of Georgeson's work involves collaborating with other artists and community members.

== Filmography ==
- 2011 - Squaw Hall: A Community Remembers - Georgeson worked in collaboration with Twin Fish Theatre company from Nelson, British Columbia on the Squaw Hall Project. The project was produced over a period of 2 years (2009–2011) and the results included A Community Remembers film and a theatre production, Damned if you do, What if you don't. Both were developed in collaboration with youth and elders in the small community of Williams Lake in the interior of British Columbia. Community members from the Secwepemc, Carrier, and Tsilhqot'in nations guided the collaboration with Georgeson.
- 2013 - We Have Stories: Women in Fish - A documentary that explores the role of women in the British Columbia fishing industry.

== Non-film work ==
- 2002 - "Rare Earth Arias" (Women writers from the Downtown Eastside)
- 2005 - "We're All in This Together: Negotiating Collaborative Creation in a Play about Addiction"
- 2013 - "Learning from Our Mistakes: Building Relationships through the Arts with First Nations Communities"
- 2013 - "Women in Fish: Multimedia & Live Performance" at the Downtown Eastside Heart of the City Festival
- 2014 - "Alternative Sovereignties: Decolonization Through Indigenous Vision and Struggle" (Speaker panel)

== Personal awards and honors ==
- Women in Fish (CBC 4 part radio series and documentary) was shortlisted for a Jack Webster Award for Best Documentary
