= Serenella Iovino =

Serenella Iovino is an Italian cultural and literary theorist, and a distinguished professor at the University of North Carolina at Chapel Hill. She is considered one of the main environmental philosophers of Italy. She is a contributor to the Italian newspaper la Repubblica.

== Career ==
From 2001 to 2018, Iovino was a professor of the Department of Foreign Languages and Literatures and of Modern Cultures at the University of Turin, Italy. From 2008 to 2010, she also served as President of the European Association for the Study of Literature, Culture and Environment (EASLCE). In 2014, Iovino was a J. K. Binder Lecturer at the University of California, San Diego.

In 2019 Iovino became Professor of Italian Studies and Environmental Humanities at the University of North Carolina, the first ever to obtain this double appointment. In 2024 she was named James Gordon Hanes Distinguished Professor in Humanities.

Iovino has published extensively on ecocriticism, literature, and environmental ethics. Iovino is the main proponent for material ecocriticism, a current of ecocritical thought. Her book Ecocriticism and Italy: Ecology, Resistance, and Liberation was awarded the 2016 Book Prize of the American Association for Italian Studies and the MLA's 2016 Aldo and Jeanne Scaglione Prize for Italian Studies. In 2025 she received the Seres Puentes Award from the Arizona State University, an academic lifetime achievement award for contributions to the field of environmental humanities.

== Publications ==
- Gli animali di Calvino. Storie dall'Antropocene. Roma: Treccani Libri, 2023.
- Paesaggio civile. Storie di ambiente, cultura e resistenza. Milano: Il Saggiatore, 2022.
- Iovino, Serenella (2021). Italo Calvino's Animals. doi:10.1017/9781009063586. ISBN 978-1-00-906358-6.
- Italy and the Environmental Humanities: Landscapes, Natures, Ecologies. Edited by Serenella Iovino, Enrico Cesaretti, and Elena Past. Charlottesville: University of Virginia Press, 2018.
- Environmental Humanities: Voices from the Anthropocene. Edited by Serpil Oppermann and Serenella Iovino. London: Rowman & Littlefield International, 2016.
- Ecocriticism and Italy: Ecology, Resistance and Liberation. London: Bloomsbury Academics, 2016.
- Material Ecocriticism. Edited by Serenella Iovino and Serpil Oppermann. Bloomington: Indiana University Press, 2014.
- Ecologia letteraria: Una strategia di sopravvivenza. Milan. Edizioni Ambiente, 2006 (2nd ed. 2015).
- Filosofie dell’ambiente. Natura, Etica, Società. Rome: Carocci, 2004. (Repr. 2006, 2007, 2008).
- Il ‘Woldemar’ di F.H. Jacobi, introduzione, traduzione e commento storico-critico. Padua: CEDAM, 2000.
- Radice della Virtù. Saggio sul ‘Woldemar’ di F.H. Jacobi. Naples: Città del Sole, 1999.

== Awards ==
- 2025: Seres Puentes International Award, Humanities for the Environment North American Observatory at the Global Futures Laboratory (UNESCO Bridges Programme, Arizona State University.
- 2025: Green Book Premio Letterario, for Gli animali di Calvino. Storie dall'Antropocene (Treccani Libri, 2023).
- 2023: XI Premio Nazionale di Divulgazione Scientifica "Giancarlo Dosi" (area: Humanities), for Gli animali di Calvino. Storie dall'Antropocene (Treccani Libri, 2023).
- 2016: Aldo and Jeanne Scaglione Prize for Italian Studies Winners for Ecocriticism and Italy: Ecology, Resistance, and Liberation (Bloomsbury, 2016).
- 2016: American Association for Italian Studies Book Prize for Ecocriticism and Italy: Ecology, Resistance, and Liberation. New York: Bloomsbury, 2016.
