= Sandro Iovino =

Italian voice actor

- Born: Alessandro Iovino; 26 August 1939 (age 86); Rome, Italy
- Occupations: Actor; voice actor
- Years active: 1968-present

Alessandro "Sandro" Iovino (born 26 August 1939) is an Italian actor and voice actor.

== Biography ==
Born in Rome with a career spanning over 50 years, Iovino started out as a stage and television actor in the late 1960s. On stage, he starred in theatre adaptions of William Shakespeare's plays such as Julius Caesar and Twelfth Night. As a voice actor, Iovino is typically known for dubbing villainous characters, most notably Mr. Burns in the Italian-Language version of The Simpsons. In the Disney period, he dubbed Foxy Loxy in Chicken Little and Walt Disney talking about Donald Duck.

Other dubbing roles Iovino is known for include J. Jonah Jameson (portrayed by J.K. Simmons) in the Italian-Language version of the Spider-Man film series and Windom Earle (portrayed by Kenneth Welsh) in the Italian-Language version of Twin Peaks. Among the actors Iovino dubs include Rutger Hauer, F. Murray Abraham, Terence Stamp, Donald Sutherland, Sam Shepard, Paul Freeman, Steven Berkoff and since the death of Sergio Rossi in 1998, he has dubbed Leslie Nielsen in most of his films.

== Dubbing roles ==
- Various character in Great Mazinger, Grendizer, Futurama, South Park (doppiaggio SEFIT-CDC)
- Farmer Tom Griggs in The Animals of Farthing Wood
- Charles Montgomery Burns in The Simpsons, The Simpsons Movie, Family Guy
- Lord Maliss in Happily Ever After
- Duke Red in Metropolis
- King Colbert in Thumbelina
- Hudson in Gargoyles
- The Encyclopod in Futurama: Into the Wild Green Yonder
- Robert Stephenson in Steamboy
- Pops in Johnny Bravo

=== Live action ===
- Roy Batty in Blade Runner
- Windom Earle in Twin Peaks
- J. Jonah Jameson in Spider-Man, Spider-Man 2, Spider-Man 3
- General Zod in Superman II
- Dick Steele in Spy Hard
- President Harris in Scary Movie 3, Scary Movie 4
- Uncle Albert in Superhero Movie
- John Practice in Last Action Hero
- Dr. René Belloq in Indiana Jones and the Raiders of the Lost Ark
- Warden Rudolph Hazen in The Longest Yard
- Francis "Lionel" Delbuchi in Scarecrow
- Thomas Perry in Dead Poets Society
- Victor Maitland in Beverly Hills Cop
- Magistrate Fang in Oliver Twist
- Principal Gibbons in Easy A
- Duke Scanlon in Christmas with the Kranks
- Rex Kramer in Airplane!
- Principal Hancock in Forrest Gump
- Richard Vernon in The Breakfast Club
- William F. Garrison in Black Hawk Down
- CIA Superior in Burn After Reading

=== Video games ===
- Charles Montgomery Burns in The Simpsons Game
