= Ann Eriksson =

Canadian author and biologist

- Occupations: Author, Biologist
- Website: www.anneriksson.ca

Ann Eriksson is a Canadian author and biologist who resides in British Columbia.

== Bibliography ==
- Decomposing Maggie (2003) ISBN 978-0-88801-283-8
- In The Hands Of Anubis (2009) ISBN 978-1-897142-35-6
