= Configurations (journal) =

- Discipline: Literature, technology, philosophy of science
- Language: English
- Edited by: Melissa M. Littlefield and Rajani Sudan

Publication details
- History: 1993–present
- Publisher: Johns Hopkins University Press for the Society for Literature, Science, and the Arts (United States)
- Frequency: Quarterly

Standard abbreviations
- ISO 4: Configurations

Indexing
- ISSN: 1063-1801 (print); 1080-6520 (web)
- OCLC no.: 31870355

Links
- Journal homepage

Configurations is an academic journal established in 1993 and the official publication of the Society for Literature, Science, and the Arts. It covers the study of discourse in science, technology, and medicine and investigates the relationship between literature and the arts and science and technology.
