= Society for Literature, Science, and the Arts =

- Predecessor: Society for Literature and Science
- Formation: 1985; 41 years ago
- Purpose: "Problems of science and representation, and in the cultural and social dimensions of science, technology, and medicine."
- President: Rajani Sudan
- Affiliations: European Society for Literature, Science and the Arts
- Website: litsciarts.org

The Society for Literature, Science, and the Arts (SLSA) is a United States–based academic organization whose members "share an interest in problems of science and representation, and in the cultural and social dimensions of science, technology, and medicine."

The SLSA publishes the journal Configurations, published by Johns Hopkins University Press, and a members' newsletter Decodings. It holds an annual conference that "attracts hundreds of participants from many different disciplines, including the history, sociology, anthropology, rhetoric, and philosophy of science, technology and medicine; literary history and criticism; art history and media studies; the cognitive sciences; and all areas of science, technology, engineering, and medicine" (the 30th being in 2016).

The European Society for Literature, Science and the Arts (SLSAeu) is a sister body.

The Society's own webpage is inconsistent as to whether there is a comma after "Science" in its name.

== History ==
The Society for Literature and Science was created at the 17th International Congress of the History of Science, held in Berkeley, California, in August 1985. It was renamed the Society for Literature, Science, and the Arts in the mid-2000s.
