= David Huebert =

Canadian writer

- Education: University of Western Ontario
- Occupation: Writer
- Writing career
- Notable awards: CBC Literary Prize (2016)
- Website: davidhuebert.com

David Huebert is a Canadian writer from Halifax, Nova Scotia.

Huebert, at the time a Ph.D. student in English literature at the University of Western Ontario, was a winner of the CBC Literary Prize in the short stories category in 2016 for the story "Enigma".

His debut short story collection, Peninsula Sinking, was published in 2017, and was a finalist for the Danuta Gleed Literary Award in 2018. In 2021, it was also retroactively shortlisted for the delayed 2018 ReLit Award for short fiction.

In 2020, he was shortlisted for the Journey Prize for his short story "Chemical Valley". It was the title story of his second short story collection, Chemical Valley (2021), which was shortlisted for the 2022 ReLit Award for short fiction and both the Thomas Head Raddall Award for fiction and the Alistair MacLeod Prize for Short Fiction at the 2022 Atlantic Book Awards.

He has also published the poetry chapbook Full Mondegreens (2017), a collaboration with Andy Verboom in which they composed mondegreen versions of other writers' previously published poetry, and the solo poetry collection Humanimus (2020).

In 2024, he published his debut novel, Oil People. The book was shortlisted for the 2025 Amazon.ca First Novel Award, and won the Thomas Raddall Atlantic Fiction Award in 2025.

Huebert has worked as an assistant professor of English literature at the University of New Brunswick, and has taught creative writing at Dalhousie University. He currently teaches in the Master of Fine Arts in Fiction program at the University of King's College.

Huebert is also co-editor of The Goose, the journal of Wilfrid Laurier University's Association for Literature, Environment, and Culture in Canada.
