= Clare Walker Leslie =

Naturalist, artist, and writer

Clare Walker Leslie (born March 1, 1947) is a naturalist, artist, and writer. She is best known for her nature journals. She advocates their use by the wider public.

== Early life and education ==
She grew up outside of Philadelphia and has a degree in art history from Carleton College.

== Career ==
She has taught at Williams College, MIT, Harvard’s Landscape Design Program, College of the Atlantic, Antioch New England, and numerous Audubon centers. She is a member of the National Guild of Science Illustrators and the international Artists For Nature Foundation.

== Personal life ==
She lives with her husband and family in Cambridge, Massachusetts, and in Granville, Vermont.

== Books ==
- A Year in Nature: A Memoir of Solace Green Writers Press of Brattleboro
- The Curious Nature Guide, 2015
- The Nature Connection Storey Publishing, 2010
- Keeping a Nature Journal: Discover a Whole New Way of Seeing the World Around You
- Drawn to Nature: From the Journals of Clare Walker Leslie 2005
- Nature All Year Long
- Nature Drawing: A Tool for Learning
- The Art of Field Sketching
- The Ancient Celtic Festivals and How We Celebrate Them Today
- A Naturalist's Sketchbook: Pages from the Seasons of the Year 1987
- Notes from a Naturalist's Sketchbook 1981
