= Western Literature Association =

Scholarly non-profit association

- Abbreviation: WLA
- Formation: 1965 (61 years ago)
- Type: Nonprofit organization Scholarly association
- Location(s): PO Box 6815, Logan, Utah, 84341; United States
- Fields: Literature and cultures of the North American West
- Presidents: Alex Hunt (2020); Kerry Fine (2020); Rebecca Lush (2020)
- Publication: Western American Literature (WAL)
- Affiliations: Modern Language Association; American Literature Association; Association for the Study of Literature and Environment; Society for the Study of American Women Writers; Pacific Ancient and Modern Language Association
- Website: www.westernlit.org

The Western Literature Association (WLA) is a non-profit, scholarly association that promotes the study of the diverse literature and cultures of the North American West, past and present. Since its founding, the WLA has served to publish scholarship and promote work in the field; it has gathered together scholars, artists, environmentalists, and community leaders who value the West's literary and cultural contributions to American and world cultures; it has recognized those who have made a major contribution to western literature and western studies; and it has fostered student learning and career advancement in education.

The Association for the Study of Literature and Environment (ASLE) was founded in 1992 at a special session of the Western Literature Association conference in Reno, Nevada, for the purpose of "sharing of facts, ideas, and texts concerning the study of literature and the environment."

The Association publishes Western American Literature: A Journal of Literary, Cultural, and Place Studies (since 1965) in partnership with the University of Nebraska Press. It considers itself "the leading peer-reviewed journal in the literary and cultural study of the North American West, defined broadly to include western Canada and northern Mexico".

== List of WLA Presidents and Annual Conferences ==
This is a list of people who have served as presidents of the organization and have hosted the annual conference.

#	President	Affiliation	Date	Conference Theme	Conference Venue
1	C. L. Sonnichsen		1966		Salt Lake City, Utah
2	Delbert Wylder		1967		Albuquerque, New Mexico
3	Jim L. Fife		1968		Colorado Springs, Colorado
4	Morton L. Ross		1969		Provo, Utah
5	Don D. Walker		1970		Sun Valley, Idaho
6	John R. Milton		1971		Red Cloud, Nebraska
7	Thomas J. Lyon		1972		Jackson Hole, Wyoming
8	Max Westbrook		1973		Austin, Texas
9	John S. Bullen		1974		Sonoma, California
10	Maynard Fox		1975		Durango, Colorado
11	Lawrence L. Lee		1976		Bellingham, Washington
12	Arthur Huseboe		1977		Sioux Falls, South Dakota
13	Mary Washington		1978		Park City, Utah
14	Richard Etulain		1979		Albuquerque, New Mexico
15	Bernice Slote		1980		University of Nebraska–Lincoln
15	Helen Stauffer		1980		St. Louis Missouri
16	James Maguire		1981		Boise, Idaho
17	Martin Bucco		1982		Denver Colorado
18	George Day		1983		Saint Paul, Minnesota
19	Ann Ronald		1984		Reno, Nevada
20	Gerald Haslam		1985		Fort Worth, Texas
21	Tom Pilkington		1986		Durango, Colorado
22	Susan J. Rosowski		1987		Lincoln, Nebraska
23	Glen Love		1988		Eugene, Oregon
24	Barbara Meldrum		1989		Coeur d'Alene, Idaho
25	Lawrence Clayton		1990		Denton, Texas
26	James Work		1991		Estes Park, Colorado
27	Joseph Flora		1992		Reno, Nevada
28	Diane Quantic		1993		Wichita, Kansas
29	Stephen Tatum		1994		Salt Lake City, Utah
30	Laurie Ricou		1995		Vancouver, British Columbia, Canada
31	Susanne K. George Bloomfield		1996		Lincoln, Nebraska
32	Gary Scharnhorst		1997		Albuquerque, New Mexico
33	Robert Thacker	St. Lawrence University, New York	1998		Banff, Alberta (Canada)
34	Michael Kowalewski	Carleton College, Northfield, Minnesota	13-16 Oct 1999	West of the West: California and the American West	Radisson Hotel, Sacramento, California
35	Robert Murray Davis		2000		Norman, Oklahoma
36	Susan Naramore Maher,		2001		Omaha, Nebraska
37	Judy Nolte Temple		2002		Tucson, Arizona
38	Krista Comer		2003		Houston, Texas
39	Susan Kollin	Montana State University	29 Sep- 2 Oct 2004		Big Sky Institute, Big Sky, Montana
40	William Handley		19- 22 Oct 2005		Omni Hotel, Los Angeles, California
41	Tara Penry	Boise State University	25-28 Oct 2006	Feeling Western	The Grove Hotel, Boise, Idaho
42	Ann Putnam	University of Puget Sound	17-20 Oct 2007		Tacoma, Washington
43	Nic Witschi	Western Michigan University	1-4 Oct 2008		Boulder, Colorado
43	Karen Ramirez	University of Colorado, Boulder	1-4 Oct 2008		Boulder, Colorado
44	David Cremean	Black Hills State University	30 Sep- 3 Oct 2009	High Plains Drifting: Which Way(s) West?	Holiday Inn, Spearfish, South Dakota
45	Gioia Woods	Northern Arizona University	20-23 Oct 2010	Western Performances	Gazebo, Prescott, Arizona
46	Bonney MacDonald	West Texas A&M University	5-8 Oct 2011		Holiday Inn, Missoula, Montana
46	Nancy Cook	University of Montana	5-8 Oct 2011		Holiday Inn, Missoula, Montana
47	Sara Spurgeon	Texas Tech University	7-12 Nov 2012	Western Crossroads: Literature, Social Justice, Environment	Overton Hotel & Conference Centre, Lubbock, Texas
48	Richard Hutson	University of California, Berkeley	9-12 Oct 2013	Califia: The West Calling the World	DoubleTree by Hilton Hotel, Berkeley, California
49	Anne Kaufman	Milton Academy	5-8 Nov 2014	Bordersongs	Fairmont Empress, Victoria, British Columbia, Canada
49	Laurie Ricou	University of British Columbia	5-8 Nov 2014	Bordersongs	Fairmont Empress, Victoria, British Columbia, Canada
50	David Fenimore	University of Nevada, Reno	14-17 Oct 2015	Visual Culture in the Urban West	Harrah's Robert A. Ring Convention Center, Reno, Nevada
50	Susan Bernardin	SUNY Oneonta	14-17 Oct 2015	Visual Culture in the Urban West	Harrah's Robert A. Ring Convention Center, Reno, Nevada
51	Linda Karell	Montana State University	21-24 Sep 2016	The Profane West	Big Sky, Montana
52	Susan N. Maher	University of Minnesota Duluth	25-28 Oct 2017	Sweet Land, Mighty Waters: Myth and Storytelling West of the Mississippi	Chase Park Plaza Hotel, Minneapolis, Minnesota
52	Florence Amamoto	Gustavus Adolphus College	25-28 Oct 2017	Sweet Land, Mighty Waters: Myth and Storytelling West of the Mississippi	Chase Park Plaza Hotel, Minneapolis, Minnesota
53	Michael K. Johnson	University of Maine-Farmington	24-27 Oct 2018	Indigenous Hubs • Gateway Cities • Border States	Chase Park Plaza Hotel, St. Louis, Missouri
53	Emily Lutenski	St. Louis University	24-27 Oct 2018	Indigenous Hubs • Gateway Cities • Border States	Chase Park Plaza Hotel, St. Louis, Missouri
54	SueEllen Campbell	Colorado State University	18-21 Sep 2019	Not Cloudy All Day: Climates of Change in the American West	Long's Peak Lodge, Estes Park, Colorado
55	Kerry Fine	Arizona State University	21-24 Oct 2020	Graphic Wests	Virtual conference (due to COVID-19 pandemic)
55	Rebecca Lush	California State University, San Marcos	21-24 Oct 2020	Graphic Wests	Virtual conference (due to COVID-19 pandemic)
