= Ecocriticism =

Interdisciplinary study of literature and environment

Ecocriticism is the study of literature and ecology from an interdisciplinary point of view, where literature scholars analyze texts that illustrate environmental concerns and examine the various ways literature treats the subject of nature. It was first originated by Joseph Meeker as an idea called "literary ecology" in his The Comedy of Survival: Studies in Literary Ecology (1972).

The term 'ecocriticism' was coined in 1978 by William H. Rueckert in his essay "Literature and Ecology: An Experiment in Ecocriticism". It takes an interdisciplinary point of view by analyzing the works of authors, researchers and poets in the context of environmental issues and nature. Some ecocritics brainstorm possible solutions for the correction of the contemporary environmental situation, though not all ecocritics agree on the purpose, methodology, or scope of ecocriticism.

In the United States, ecocriticism is often associated with the Association for the Study of Literature and Environment (ASLE), which hosts a biennial conference for scholars who deal with environmental matters in literature and the environmental humanities in general. ASLE publishes a journal—Interdisciplinary Studies in Literature and Environment (ISLE)—in which current international scholarship can be found.

Ecocriticism is an intentionally broad approach that is known by a number of other designations, including "green (cultural) studies", "ecopoetics", and "environmental literary criticism", and is often informed by other fields such as ecology, sustainable design, biopolitics, environmental history, environmentalism, and social ecology, among others.

== Definition ==
In comparison with other 'political' forms of criticism, there has been relatively little dispute about the moral and philosophical aims of ecocriticism, although its scope has broadened from nature writing, romantic poetry, and canonical literature to take in film, television, theatre, animal stories, architectures, scientific narratives and an extraordinary range of literary texts. At the same time, ecocriticism has borrowed methodologies and theoretically informed approaches liberally from other fields of literary, social and scientific study.

Cheryll Glotfelty's working definition in The Ecocriticism Reader is that "ecocriticism is the study of the relationship between literature and the physical environment", and one of the implicit goals of the approach is to recoup professional dignity for what Glotfelty calls the "undervalued genre of nature writing". Lawrence Buell defines "'ecocriticism' ... as [a] study of the relationship between literature and the environment conducted in a spirit of commitment to environmentalist praxis".

Simon Estok noted in 2001 that "ecocriticism has distinguished itself, debates notwithstanding, firstly by the ethical stand it takes, its commitment to the natural world as an important thing rather than simply as an object of thematic study, and, secondly, by its commitment to making connections".

More recently, in an article that extends ecocriticism to Shakespearean studies, Estok argues that ecocriticism is more than "simply the study of Nature or natural things in literature; rather, it is any theory that is committed to effecting change by analyzing the function–thematic, artistic, social, historical, ideological, theoretical, or otherwise–of the natural environment, or aspects of it, represented in documents (literary or other) that contribute to material practices in material worlds". This echoes the functional approach of the cultural ecology branch of ecocriticism, which analyzes the analogies between ecosystems and imaginative texts and posits that such texts potentially have an ecological (regenerative, revitalizing) function in the cultural system.

As Michael P. Cohen has observed, "if you want to be an ecocritic, be prepared to explain what you do and be criticized, if not satirized." Certainly, Cohen adds his voice to such critique, noting that one of the problems of ecocriticism has been what he calls its "praise-song school" of criticism. All ecocritics share an environmentalist motivation of some sort, but whereas the majority are 'nature endorsing', some are 'nature sceptical'. In part this entails a shared sense of the ways in which 'nature' has been used to legitimize gender, sexual and racial norms (so homosexuality has been seen as 'unnatural', for example), but it also involves scepticism about the uses to which 'ecological' language is put in ecocriticism; it can also involve a critique of the ways cultural norms of nature and the environment contribute to environmental degradation. Greg Garrard has dubbed 'pastoral ecology' the notion that nature undisturbed is balanced and harmonious, while Dana Phillips has criticised the literary quality and scientific accuracy of nature writing in The Truth of Ecology. Similarly, there has been a call to recognize the place of the environmental justice movement in redefining ecocritical discourse.

In response to the question of what ecocriticism is or should be, Camilo Gomides has offered an operational definition that is both broad and discriminating: "The field of enquiry that analyzes and promotes works of art which raise moral questions about human interactions with nature, while also motivating audiences to live within a limit that will be binding over generations". He tests it for a film adaptation about Amazonian deforestation. Implementing the Gomides definition, Joseph Henry Vogel makes the case that ecocriticism constitutes an "economic school of thought" as it engages audiences to debate issues of resource allocation that have no technical solution. Ashton Nichols has recently argued that the historical dangers of a romantic version of nature now need to be replaced by "urbanatural roosting", a view that sees urban life and the natural world as closely linked and argues for humans to live more lightly on the planet, the way virtually all other species do.

The interdisciplinary nature of Ecocriticism and Islam as well as their mutual interest in nature led to the coinage of Islamecocriticism in 2021. Islemecocriticism is fully introduced by ISLE: Interdisciplinary Studies in Literature and Environment in "Islamecocriticism: Green Islam Introduced to Ecocriticism." The article is shortly followed by a thorough representation of Material Islamecocriticism in "Matter Really Matters: A Poetic Material Islamecocritical Reading of Inanimateness Animism" which appeared in Kritika Kultura.

== In literary studies ==
Ecocritics investigate such things as the underlying ecological values, what, precisely, is meant by the word nature, and whether the examination of "place" should be a distinctive category, much like class, gender or race. Ecocritics examine human perception of wilderness, and how it has changed throughout history and whether or not current environmental issues are accurately represented or even mentioned in popular culture and modern literature. Not only do ecocritics determine the actual meaning of nature writing texts, but they use those texts for analyzing the practices of society in relationship to nature. They also critique visions that are human-centered and man/male centered. Scholars in ecocriticism engage in questions regarding anthropocentrism, and the "mainstream assumption that the natural world be seen primarily as a resource for human beings" as well as critical approaches to changing ideas in "the material and cultural bases of modern society." Recently, "empirical ecocritics" have begun empirically evaluating the influence of ecofiction on its readers and the prevalence of environmental narratives in literature and popular media. Other disciplines, such as history, economics, philosophy, ethics, and psychology, are also considered by ecocritics to be possible contributors to ecocriticism.

While William Rueckert may have been the first person to use the term ecocriticism (Barry 240) in his 1978 essay entitled Literature and Ecology: An Experiment in Ecocriticism, ecocriticism as a movement owes much to Rachel Carson's 1962 environmental exposé Silent Spring. Drawing from this critical moment, Rueckert's intent was to focus on "the application of ecology and ecological concepts to the study of literature".

Ecologically minded individuals and scholars have been publishing progressive works of ecotheory and criticism since the explosion of environmentalism in the late 1960s and 1970s. However, because there was no organized movement to study the ecological/environmental side of literature, these important works were scattered and categorized under a litany of different subject headings: pastoralism, human ecology, regionalism, American Studies etc. British marxist critic Raymond Williams, for example, wrote a seminal critique of pastoral literature in 1973, The Country and the City.

Another early ecocritical text, Joseph Meeker's The Comedy of Survival (1974), proposed a version of an argument that was later to dominate ecocriticism and environmental philosophy; that environmental crisis is caused primarily by a cultural tradition in the West of separation of culture from nature, and elevation of the former to moral predominance. Such anthropocentrism is identified in the tragic conception of a hero whose moral struggles are more important than mere biological survival, whereas the science of animal ethology, Meeker asserts, shows that a "comic mode" of muddling through and "making love not war" has superior ecological value. In the later, "second wave" ecocriticism, Meeker's adoption of an ecophilosophical position with apparent scientific sanction as a measure of literary value tended to prevail over Williams's ideological and historical critique of the shifts in a literary genre's representation of nature.

As Glotfelty noted in The Ecocriticism Reader, "One indication of the disunity of the early efforts is that these critics rarely cited one another's work; they didn't know that it existed...Each was a single voice howling in the wilderness." Nevertheless, ecocriticism—unlike feminist and Marxist criticisms—failed to crystallize into a coherent movement in the late 1970s, and indeed only did so in the US in the 1990s.

In the mid-1980s, scholars began to work collectively to establish ecocriticism as a genre, primarily through the work of the Western Literature Association in which the revaluation of nature writing as a non-fictional literary genre could function. During the late-1980s poet Jack Collom was awarded a 2nd National Endowment for the Arts grant, for his ground-breaking work in this emerging genre. Collom taught an influential Eco-Lit course at Naropa University in Boulder, Colorado, for nearly two decades. In 1990, at the University of Nevada, Reno, Glotfelty became the first person to hold an academic position as a professor of Literature and the Environment, and UNR, with the aid of the now-retired Glotfelty and the remaining professor Michael P. Branch, has retained the position it established at that time as the intellectual home of ecocriticism even as ASLE has burgeoned into an organization with thousands of members in the US alone. From the late 1990s, new branches of ASLE and affiliated organizations were started in the UK, Japan, Korea, Australia and New Zealand (ASLEC-ANZ), India (OSLE-India), Southeast Asia (ASLE-ASEAN), Taiwan, Canada and continental Europe. The emergence of ecocriticism in British literary criticism is usually dated to the publication in 1991 of Romantic Ecology: Wordsworth and the Environmental Tradition by Jonathan Bate.

Ecocriticism’s second wave emerged in the 2000s through a more complex understanding of the overall history of global environmentalism and environmental justice. According to Lawrence Buell, former Harvard professor and proponent of ecocriticism, the second wave of ecocriticism aligns with public health environmentalism, with ethics and politics that are sociocentric rather than ecocentric. The second wave not only considers rural landscapes or wilderness, but also landscapes of urban and industrial transformation. It is inspired by writers such as Charles Dickens, who wrote about Victorian-era public health concerns, and the American novelist Upton Sinclair, as well as by global activists, such as Ken Saro-Wiwa, who was executed for his protests against ecological devastation in Nigeria, and Michiko Ishimure, who wrote about Minamata disease and the effects of mercury poisoning. The second wave of ecocriticism distinguishes itself from the first wave by prioritizing the exploration of issues such as environmental resource distribution, environmental justice, minority and socioeconomic impacts related to environmental circumstances. A representative of second-wave ecocriticism is the 2002 Environmental Justice Reader: Politics, Poetics, and Pedagogy.

Recent eco-critical scholarship has seen issues concerning eco-anxiety, veganism, and activism take precedence. Scholars are now starting to take into consideration the impact of the Covid-19 pandemic on environmental activism and the climate crisis more broadly. In their 2022 Special Issue for Green Letters entitled 'A New Poetics of Space', the co-editors, Lucy Jeffery and Vicky Angelaki, remark: 'We hope that through the analysis of the act of walking in the creative arts we can understand our role in shaping the environmental state in which we find ourselves. Throughout this volume we ask: is there a way yet to describe how our attitude towards our being in the environment has shifted since the Covid-19 pandemic?' This scholarly volume is evidence of a current trend in eco-critical scholarship to explore the impact of the twenty-first century's technological developments, societal shifts, environmental challenges, and political situation through the perspective of creative works that are concerned with the poetics of space, health, and the environment (both urban and rural).

== See also ==
- Animal studies
- Critical theory
- Cultural ecology
- Ecolinguistics
- Ecosophy
- Ethnobiology
- Environmental humanities
- Nature in children's literature

== Sources ==
- Abram, David. The Spell of the Sensuous: Perception and Language in a More-than-Human World. New York: Pantheon, 1996.
- Alex, Rayson K., S. Susan Deborah & Sachindev P.S. Culture and Media: Ecocritical Explorations. Cambridge: Cambridge Scholars Publishing, 2014.
- Barry, Peter. "Ecocriticism". Beginning Theory: An Introduction to Literary and Cultural Theory. 3rd ed. Manchester: Manchester UP, 2009.
- Bate, Jonathan. Romantic Ecology: Wordsworth and the Environmental Tradition. London and New York: Routledge, 1991.
- Bladow, Kyle and Jennifer Ladino (Eds). "Affective Ecocriticism: Emotion, Embodiment, Environment". Lincoln and London: University of Nebraska Press, 2018.
- Buell, Lawrence. The Environmental Imagination: Thoreau, Nature Writing, and the Formation of American Culture. Cambridge, Massachusetts and London, England: Harvard University Press, 1995.
- Bilbro, Jeffrey. Loving God's Wildness: The Christian Roots of Ecological Ethics in American Literature. Tuscaloosa: University of Alabama Press, 2015.
- Buell, Lawrence. "Toxic Discourse." Critical Inquiry 24.3 (1998): 639–665.
- Buell, Lawrence. Writing for an Endangered World: Literature, Culture, and Environment in the U.S. and Beyond. Cambridge, Massachusetts and London, England: The Belknap Press of Harvard University Press, 2001.
- Cohen, Michael P. "Blues in Green: Ecocriticism Under Critique." Environmental History 9. 1 (January 2004): 9–36.
- Coupe, Laurence, ed. The Green Studies Reader: From Romanticism to Ecocriticism. London: Routledge, 2000.
- Cranston, CA. & Robert Zeller, eds. "The Littoral Zone: Australian Contexts and their Writers". New York: Rodopi, 2007.
- Estok, Simon C. (2001). "A Report Card on Ecocriticism." AUMLA 96 (November): 200–38.
- Estok, Simon C. (2005). "Shakespeare and Ecocriticism: An Analysis of 'Home' and 'Power' in King Lear." AUMLA 103 (May 2005): 15–41.
- Forns-Broggi, Roberto. "La aventura perdida del ecopoema Archived 9 April 2016 at the Wayback Machine" in Fórnix 5/6 (2007): 376–394. (in Spanish)
- Frederick, Suresh. Contemporary Contemplations on Ecoliterature. New Delhi:Authorpress, 2012.
- Frederick, Suresh. Ecocriticism: Paradigms and Praxis. Chennai: NCBH, Dec 2019. Print.
- Frederick, Suresh and Samuel Rufus. Contemporary Contemplations on Green Literatures. New Delhi: Authorpress, 2021.
- Garrard, Greg, Ecocriticism. New York: Routledge, 2004.
- Garrard, Greg (ed.), The Oxford Handbook of Ecocriticism. Oxford: Oxford University Press, 2014.
- Glotfelty, Cheryll and Fromm, Harold (Eds). The Ecocriticism Reader: Landmarks in Literary Ecology. Athens and London: University of Georgia, 1996.
- Gomides, Camilo. 'Putting a New Definition of Ecocriticism to the Test: The Case of The Burning Season, a film (mal)Adaptation". ISLE 13.1 (2006): 13–23.
- Heise, Ursula K. "Greening English: Recent Introductions to Ecocriticism." Contemporary Literature 47.2 (2006): 289–298.
- Indian Journal of Ecocriticism
- Iovino, Serenella and Serpil Oppermann (Eds). "Material Ecocriticism". Minneapolis: University of Minnesota Press, 2014.
- Kroeber, Karl. Ecological Literary Criticism: Romantic Imagining and the Biology of Mind. New York: Columbia UP, 1994.
- Lindholdt, Paul. Explorations in Ecocriticism: Advocacy, Bioregionalism, and Visual Design, Lanham, MD: Lexington Books, 2015.
- Marx, Leo. The Machine in the Garden: Technology and the Pastoral Ideal in America. Oxford: Oxford University Press, 1964.
- McKusick, James C. Green Writing: Romanticism and Ecology. New York: St. Martin's, 2000.
- Meeker, Joseph W. "The Comedy of Survival: Studies in Literary Ecology." New York: Scribner's, 1972.
- Moore, Bryan L. Ecology and Literature: Ecocentric Personification from Antiquity to the Twenty-first Century. New York: Palgrave Macmillan, 2008.
- Morton, Timothy. The Ecological Thought. Cambridge, MAL Harvard University Press, 2012.
- Nichols, Ashton. "Beyond Romantic Ecocriticism: Toward Urbanatural Roosting." New York: Palgrave Macmillan, 2011. Paperback, 2012.
- Nicolson, Marjorie Hope. Mountain Gloom and Mountain Glory: The Development of the Aesthetics of the Infinite. Seattle: Univ. of Washington Press, 1959.
- Phillips, Dana. The Truth of Ecology: Nature, Culture, and Literature in America. Oxford: Oxford University Press, 2003.
- Rueckert, William H. "Literature and Ecology: An Experiment in Ecocriticism." Iowa Review 9.1 (1978): 71–86.
- Rojas Pérez, Walter. La ecocrítica hoy. San José, Costa Rica: Aire Moderno, 2004.
- Selvamony, Nirmal, Nirmaldasan & Rayson K. Alex. Essays in Ecocriticism. Delhi: Sarup and Sons and OSLE-India, 2008.
- Slovic, Scott. Seeking Awareness in American Nature Writing: Henry Thoreau, Annie Dillard, Edward Abbey, Wendell Berry, Barry Lopez. Salt Lake City, UT: University of Utah Press, 1992.
- Vogel, Joseph Henry. "Ecocriticism as an Economic School of Thought: Woody Allen's Match Point as Exemplary." OMETECA: Science and Humanities 12 (2008): 105–119.
- Williams, Raymond. The Country and the City. London: Chatto and Windus, 1973.
- Zapf, Hubert. "Literary Ecology and the Ethics of Texts." New Literary History 39.4 (2008): 847–868.
