= Hôpital Saint-Jacques (Nantes) =

University hospital in Nantes, France

Hôpital Saint-Jacques de Nantes
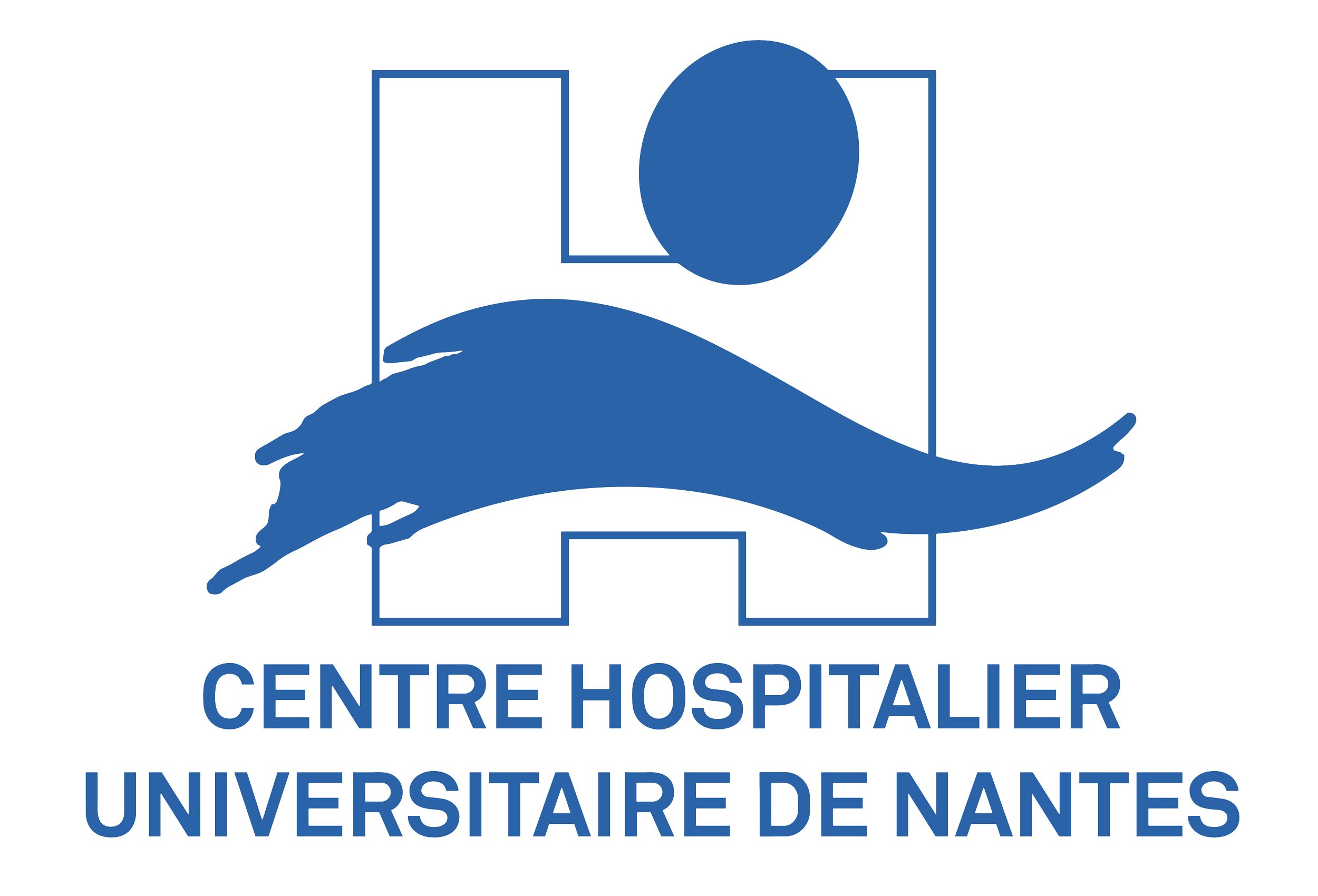

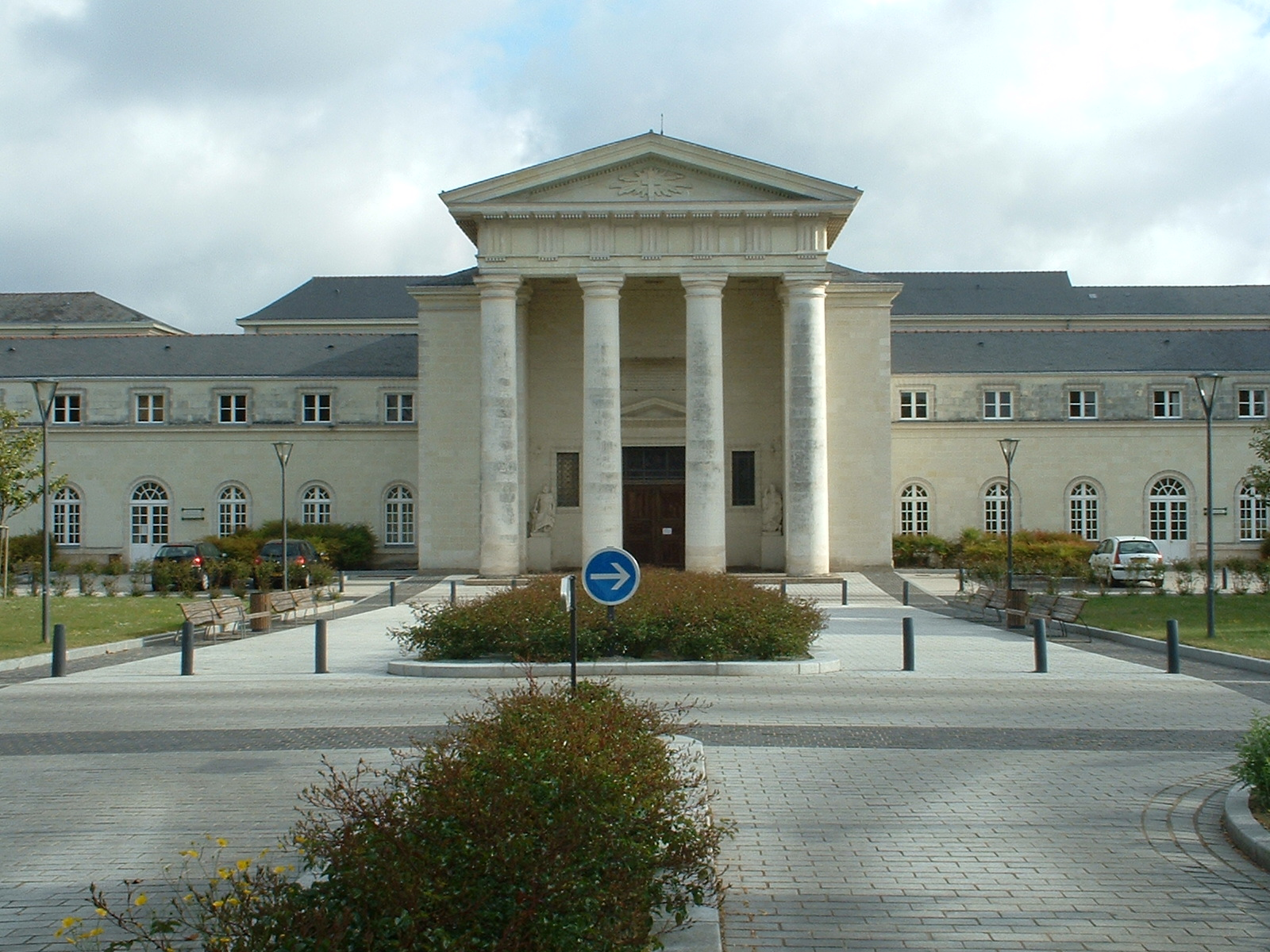
- The main entrance to Saint-Jacques Hospital, with the chapel in the center.

Geography
- Location: Nantes, Pays de la Loire, FR
- Coordinates: 47°11′52″N 1°32′12″W

Hôpital Saint-Jacques is the second oldest of the seven hospitals managed by the university hospital center of the city of Nantes, France. It is located along the left bank of the Loire (Pirmil branch), in the Nantes Sud district ("Saint-Jacques-Pirmil" micro-neighborhood).

Built in the early 19th century on the site of a former priory that had become a begging depot, it was intended to replace the outdated municipal hospice Sanitat. Originally, the role of Saint-Jacques was to provide a hospice for the insane, the impoverished elderly, and orphans. Designed according to the most advanced knowledge available at the beginning of the 19th century, it underwent regular refurbishment to keep pace with the evolution of medical and sanitary techniques and the number of patients admitted. The destruction of the Hôtel-Dieu in 1943 made Saint-Jacques the largest general hospital in the Nantes area until 1967. It then returned to its original vocation, focusing on geriatrics and psychiatry.

== History ==
=== Saint-Jacques de Pirmil Priory ===
The founding period of the Benedictine Abbey of Saint-Jacques (or prieuré de Pirmil) is unknown. It probably served as a refuge for travelers on the pilgrimage to Santiago de Compostela. This priory depended on the Saint-Jouin de Marnes abbey in the Poitou region. The church built by the monks of Saint-Jacques, which serves as the priory chapel, is a blend of Romanesque and ogival styles, dating from the late 12th century.; In the 19th century, remains of a Romanesque chapel were uncovered, attesting to the fact that the church was built on top of an earlier structure.

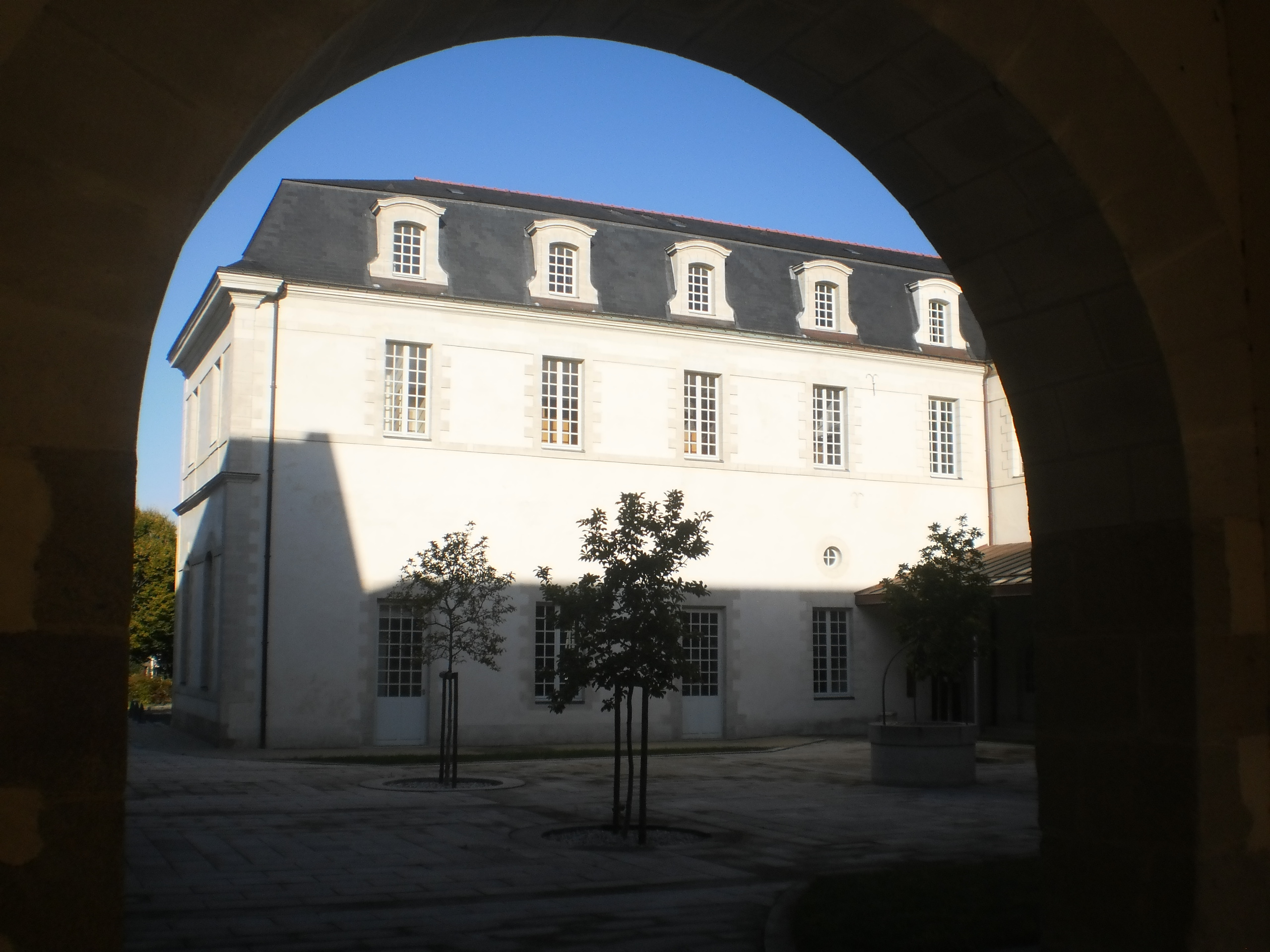
Inner courtyard of La Providence.

In 1484, Thomas James, bishop of Dol and commendatory of the monastery of Saint-Jacques, had the church restored. Between 1711 and 1713, the abbey, now owned by the Benedictines of Saint-Maur (dependent on Marmoutier Abbey), was rebuilt on the ruins of the former priory buildings. The new convent, which has no cloister, comprises a central building, the longest, parallel to the church, and two perpendicular wings at either end. To these were added two pavilions adjoining the central part and a porch. In the 21st century, all that remains of this period is the building known as "de la Providence", listed as a historic monument and comprising the central building and its two wings, the pavilions having disappeared and the entrance porch having been demolished in the mid-20th century.

Only four monks remained when the French Revolution broke out, most of whom took an oath and then asked to become laymen again. The priory became bien national and was sold in 1791 to a private individual, a Nantes merchant from Port-aux-vins. The abbey chapel became a parish church the same year. It was renamed Saint-Jacques de Pirmil, and separated from the rest of the property.

After the Battle of Nantes on June 29, 1793, the Pirmil neighborhood was partly destroyed, and the homeless inhabitants found refuge in the former convent. On October 15, 1793, the departmental council decided that the buildings should be used as a hospital and that the borders of the Maison des Pénitentes, from which the nuns had been expelled in February, could be transferred there, but the operation never took place. In 1794, Saint-Jacques temporarily became a prison, housing women and children from the commune of Vue.

=== Begging depot ===
In 1808, the heirs of the new owner were forced to return the site to the French state. The property was then sold to the Loire-Inférieure département, with the mission of building a begging depot to house beggars from Loire-Inférieure, Mayenne and Morbihan. In 1811, François-Jean-Baptiste Ogée (1760–1845), architect and landlord for the département and Nantes, drew up several plans, one of which was accepted. At the same time, six buildings measuring 37 meters long by 8 meters wide were added to the "Providence" building.

Operational in 1815, the depot proved too costly. The site housed 500 indigents, but the premises were deemed unsound, unhealthy, and unsuitable. Attempts to get the "boarders" to work were hampered by their lack of drive and skill, with the proceeds covering less than 7% of expenses. The depot closed in 1819, and the buildings were sold.

=== Saint-Jacques General Hospital ===
==== Closure of the Sanitat ====
The Saint-Jacques General Hospital was created to replace the outdated Sanitat general hospital or hospice, located near the Quai de la Fosse (near the Notre-Dame de Bon-Port church), with a more modern facility. The Sanitat is not a hospital in the modern sense of the term: no patients are treated there. The establishment was originally a manor house designed by the municipality from 1569 onwards to keep plague sufferers away. It became the Sanitat in 1612, following the construction of new buildings, including a chapel. As epidemics became rarer, their purpose changed. After having been an occasional prison, its raison d'être was to take in beggars and vagrants, then prostitutes, lunatics (from 1676) and abandoned children or orphans. This last mission was for a time entrusted to the Hospice des orphelins, founded in 1774 by the shipowner and slave trader Guillaume Grou, but due to a lack of funds, the establishment closed in 1815.

In 1818, the Sanitat had 810 beds. The premises were dilapidated, their upkeep having been made difficult by the change of regime in France, with hospice revenues linked to taxes and privileges abolished by the Revolution. The construction of new buildings in 1826 did not solve the problems. With the insane accounting for over half of all residents, it was decided to move the Sanitat outside the city.

Design and financing of Hôpital Saint-Jacques

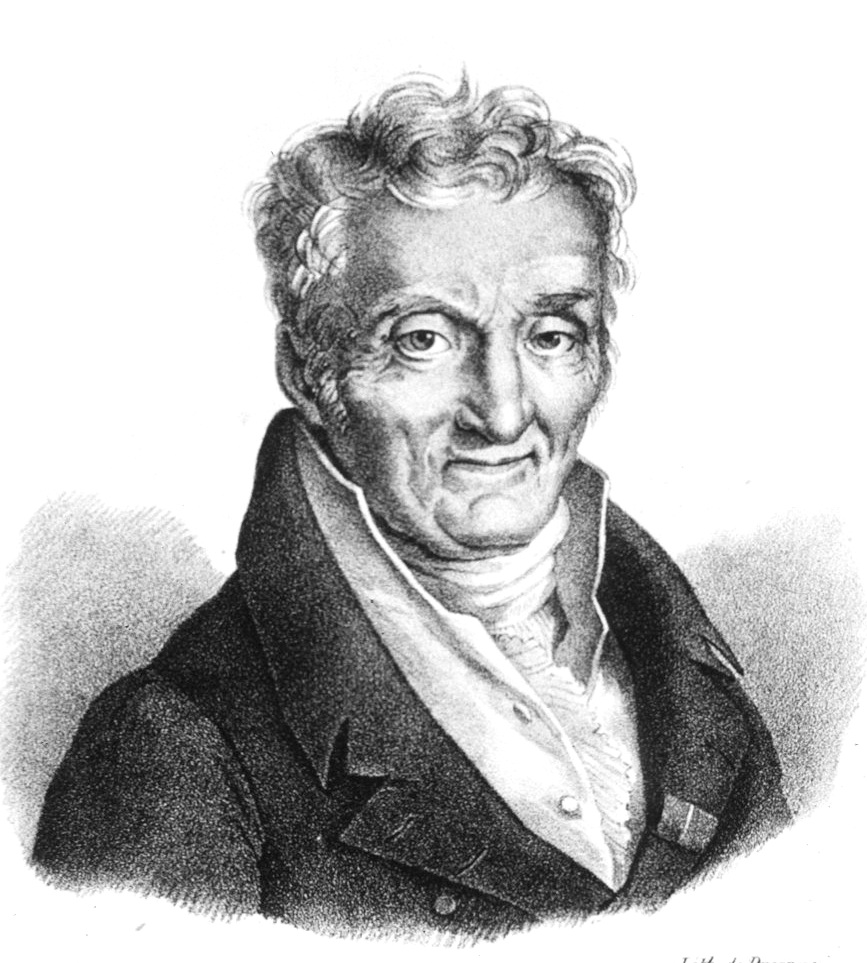
Philippe Pinel.

The approach to treating the insane evolved in the early 19th century. Philippe Pinel and his pupil Jean-Étienne Esquirol spearheaded the revival of the discipline. It was recommended that internees should no longer be allowed to lie on the floor, that the straitjacket should replace the collar and chains, and that staff should no longer use sticks or ox nerves to hit residents. A doctor is also supposed to visit each inmate once a day. The Sanitat did not allow these measures to be implemented. In 1816, plans to occupy the former orphanage were launched but abandoned two years later. In 1826, the Hospitaller Order of the Brothers of Saint John of God proposed opening a facility for the mentally ill at the Saint-Jacques begging depot, similar to those already run by the congregation. This proposal, welcomed by the prefect, was rejected by Nantes doctors. Louis-François de Tollenare, receiver then treasurer of Nantes hospitals since 1823, took up the idea. He proposed to transform the former begging depot into a hospice for the elderly, the infirm, and orphans, and to erect new buildings to accommodate the insane under the conditions then recommended by psychiatric medicine.

Tollenare was appointed director of the Sanitat by the prefect, Viscount de Villeneuve-Bargemon. The latter wished to get rid of the establishment as soon as possible, and not to commit the sums earmarked to pay for renovations. He made a secret agreement with the Order of Saint John of God, negotiated by Joseph-Xavier Tissot, a priest known as Brother Hilarion. As soon as the deal was formalized, the monks imposed an eight-year payment deadline. But Brother Hilarion's therapeutic methods gave rise to rumors, and the Prefect broke off the agreement with the cleric.

The prefect then entrusted Louis de Tollenare with managing the entire transfer of Sanitat residents. Contested by the Nantes municipality, and approved by the State, the project struggled to find financing. The operation was suspended due to the 1830 July Revolution, but then the social situation led the government of Louis-Philippe I to favor plans to open charity workshops to keep the unemployed busy. The ruling class was still reeling from the popular revolt of July 1830, and was trying to mitigate the effects of poverty to limit the risk of social upheaval. The state subsidies paid to the city of Nantes, 150,000 francs, were entirely devoted to the "charity project" of building Saint-Jacques.

In April 1832, a cholera epidemic struck Nantes, and to remedy the Hôtel-Dieu's insufficient capacity, the Sanitat, the Refuge des orphelins, and the hospice Saint-Jacques became temporary hospitals. At Saint-Jacques, women with the disease were cared for by Doctor Ange Guépin.

Mayor Ferdinand Favre delivered a speech at the laying of the foundation stone on July 28, 1832. The estimate for the construction of Saint-Jacques was 900,000 francs at the time. Additional funding was obtained from the sale of the Sanitat and its land holdings. De Tollenare obtained 600,000 francs, a good price, benefiting in the process from an increase in the value of his real estate holdings on Quai de la Fosse. The sale did, however, have the disadvantage of imposing a deadline for the move; initially scheduled for March 3, 1833, it took place in October of the same year, under pressure from the new owners of the Sanitat, who threatened legal proceedings, forcing the administration to move the residents in a hurry, into a hospice in Saint-Jacques currently under construction.

=== Construction ===
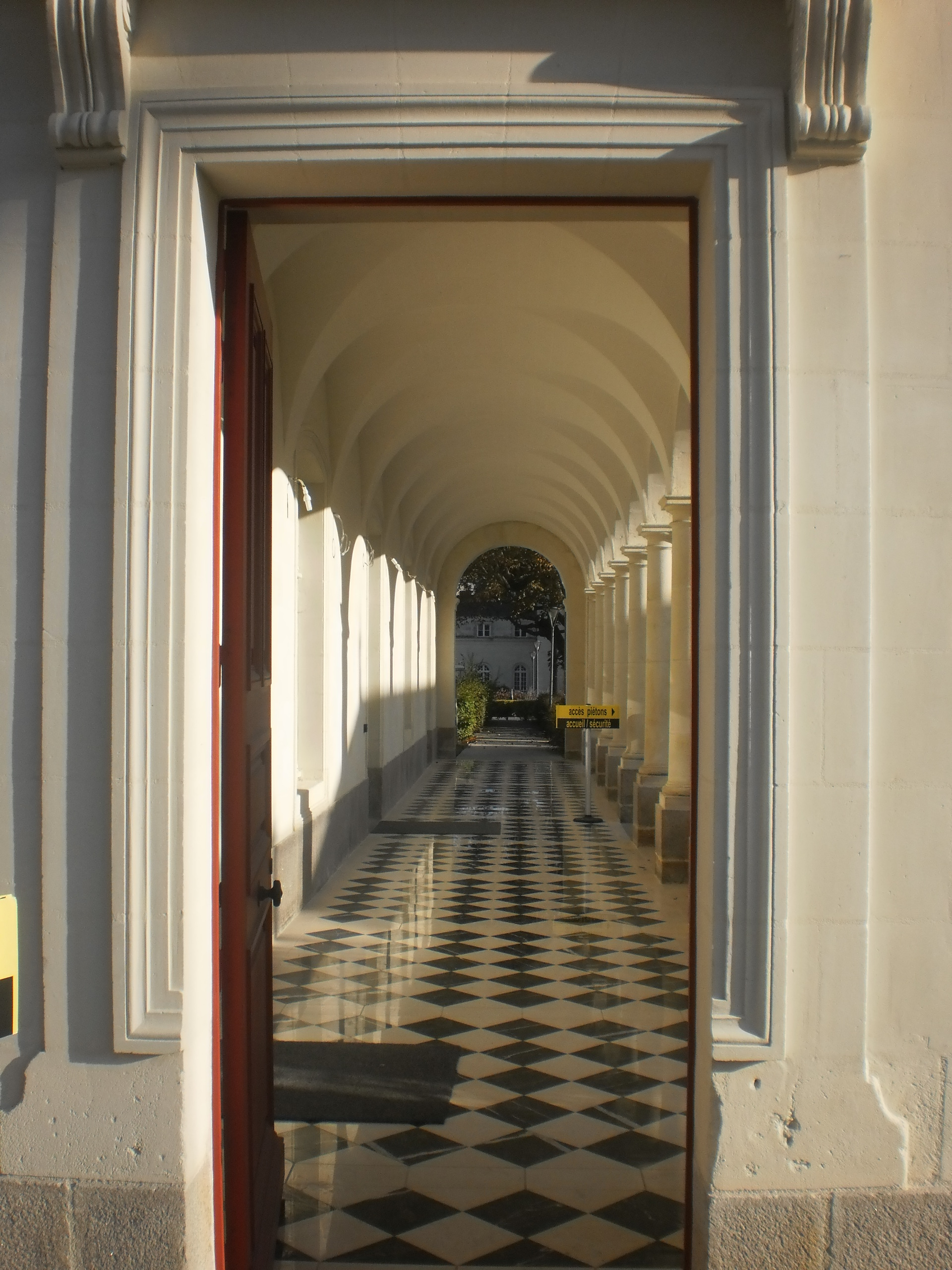
Reception corridor at the hospital's south entrance.

==== First phase, 1833-1837 ====
Brothers Louis-Prudent and Constant Douillard, renowned Nantes architects and pupils of Mathurin Crucy, were commissioned to draw up the plans for the "Hôpital Général de Saint-Jacques", with contractor Perraudeau carrying out the work and Louis-François de Tollenare overseeing the project as master builder. The workforce was made of workers recruited from charity workshops. When, in September 1834, the Sanitat's borders had to be accommodated at Saint-Jacques, only the building for the elderly had been completed. To speed up the work, head physician Camille Bouchet (1801–1854) decided to put all patients to work, including the insane. This free labor enabled the administration to make substantial savings. For example, the insane contributed to building the cells in which they would be locked up.

During construction, rocky areas had to be leveled and other areas filled in. The marshy part of the land along the Loire was raised by 4 meters. A forge and a locksmith's shop were built, to manufacture locks, repair tools, and make 150 iron beds. The sand used for masonry and earthworks was extracted from the nearby Loire River.

The water supply is an important element, particularly for the evacuation of latrines. Another important use of water was for personal hygiene, with baths an integral part of hospital operations since the 18th century. In addition to this function, baths also played a therapeutic role. For economic reasons, Dr. Bouchet installed only one bathtub. A little later, Dr. Ferrus had a bathroom installed in each pavilion with two bathtubs. At first, the water supply was transported by hand, then pumped by hand. The Douillard brothers called on a civil engineer (apparently named M. Pervac) to install a steam-driven pumping station to bring water up from the Loire, and a rainwater collection basin. These installations were not completed until 1846.

==== Influenza epidemic of 1837 ====
The winter of 1836-1837 was a late one, extending into April, with the Loire freezing over on March 26 and snow still falling on April 9. It was around that moment that an influenza epidemic hit the city. The Saint-Jacques hospital was affected in the second half of February, and by mid-March, the disease had reached practically all the hospital's patients, by which time three-quarters of Nantes' population had contracted the disease. For the city as a whole, around 260 additional deaths were attributable to the disease, while 33 influenza-related deaths were recorded at Hôpital Saint-Jacques.

==== Second construction phase, 1840-1845 ====
Once the first phase of work was completed, Doctor Bouchet and the Douillard brothers submitted a complementary project in 1837, which was not approved by the State and financed by the municipality until after 1840. In 1845, Hôpital Saint-Jacques was completed, 18 years after the laying of the foundation stone.

==== Organization of the hospital on completion ====
In 1842, the Saint-Jacques general hospital had 1,128 beds, 478 of which were reserved for the "insane". In addition to a small outpatient department (annex of the Hôtel-Dieu), Saint-Jacques comprised three hospices: one for the insane, one for the destitute elderly and infirm, and one for orphans and deaf-mutes.

==== Hospice for the mentally ill ====
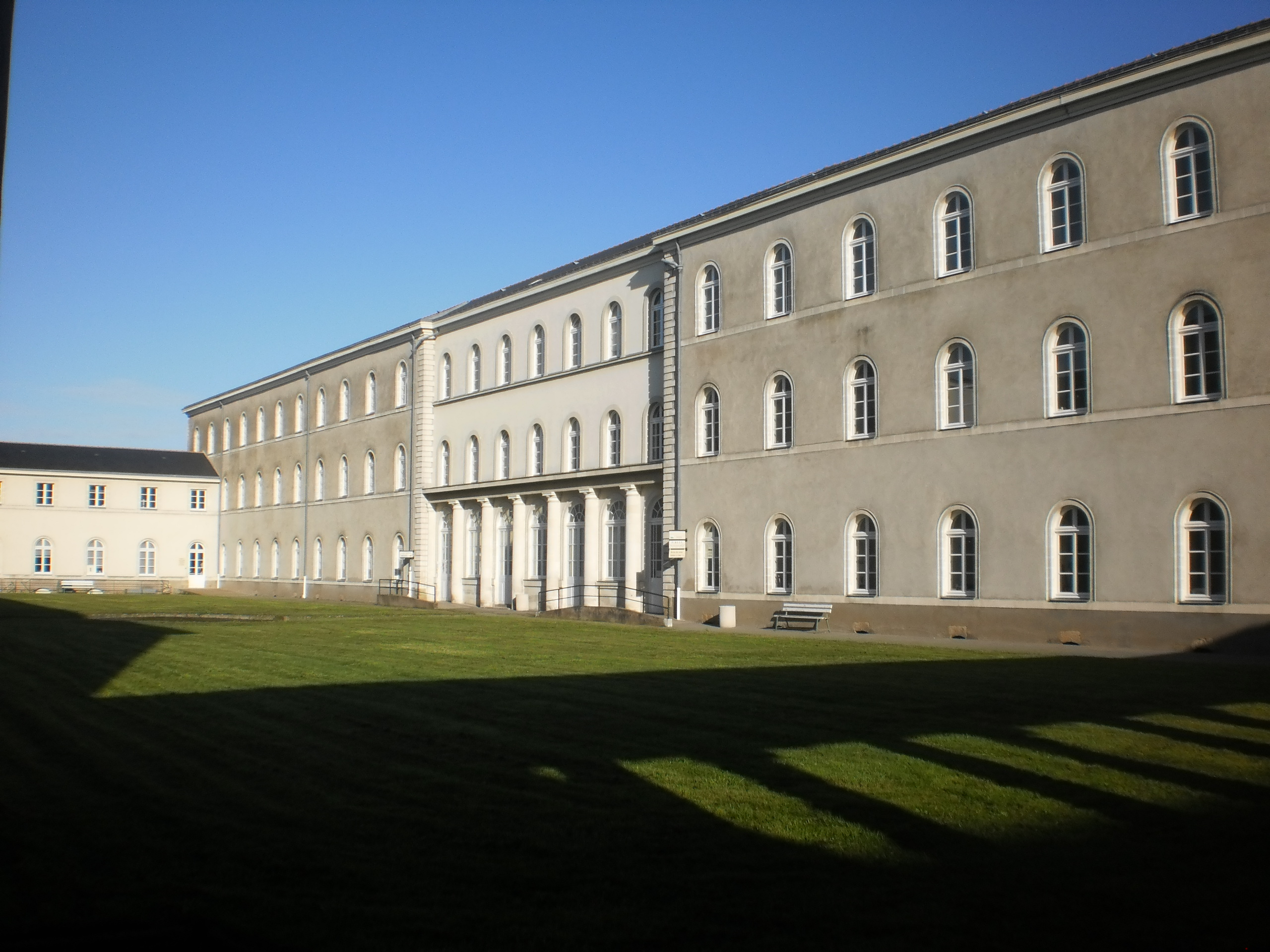
One of the buildings reserved for the insane in the 19th century.

The insane neighborhood was designed to meet the humanization needs of the time. Its location away from the center of Nantes, on a site open to the wind, responded to the theory that the air, filled with supposed "miasmas", was a cause of mental illness. Doctors Ange Guépin and Eugène Charles Bonamy in particular emphasized the project's success in this respect, although they had reservations about the buildings to the north and the first floors, which were subject to damp seepage. The environment offered to residents was also considered favorable: the surrounding countryside (at the time, the Amont meadow on Beaulieu Island was covered with pastures) and the nearby Loire River offered both a beneficial view and the opportunity for country walks and agricultural work, elements deemed beneficial to mental health by doctors Esquirol and his pupil Bouchet.

From 1835 onwards, even before the building work was completed, the Hôpital Saint-Jacques took in lunatics from the Loire-Inférieure and neighboring départements, which had no psychiatric asylum of their own, even though the law required them to do so. Men and women are separated, but insane children are mixed with adults. The various accommodation pavilions were divided according to the main categories of lunatic:

- tranquil and convalescent lunatics;
- agitated and furious lunatics;
- doddering" patients;
- epileptics.

After being dismissed as demon-possessed until the 18th century, they were now considered insane, whether or not they showed signs of mental impairment. In 1908, a study underlined the fact that this illness is still synonymous with insanity in many psychiatric establishments.

Not all "lunatics" were on the same footing: an 1875 study showed that the cure rate at Saint-Jacques was slightly higher than the national average, but also indicated that internees whose families paid for their stay were much better off than indigent patients. As the majority of deaths were linked to poor hygiene, the slightly more advantageous conditions granted by relatives' money ensured that the beneficiaries had a clear advantage over the poor.

Hospice for the elderly

The old people's home occupied the "Providence" buildings and the two large central buildings running east–west, with the chapel in the center. In 1835, it housed 412 residents. These were divided into two categories.

Old or infirm indigents are admitted from the age of 60, provided they have been resident in Nantes for at least three years, and on presentation of either a medical certificate attesting to an infirmity, or a certificate of indigence drawn up by the commissary of the district of origin. Similarly, only a medical certificate can prevent a resident from taking part in compulsory work within the establishment. Those who worked received a small stipend. Following the publication of the law of July 3, 1906, a weekly rest period was introduced, and in 1955 this type of activity was banned, as it was considered to be forced labor, unreported employment, and unfair competition with hospital staff. In the 19th century, the living conditions of these old people, although better than those in the Sanitat, were quite difficult. They were housed in dormitories with 24 beds, with poor heating. Space heaters are forbidden. The diet consists of bread, soup, a little wine, and water. Linen is changed once a week at best, but water shortages mean this is not always possible.

Paying boarders are better off. They must meet age and residency requirements (60 years old and have lived in Nantes for 3 years), and be able to pay their board. They have individual rooms. Their diet is better than that of "non-paying" residents. They have the right to go out in town.

Orphans' hospice

Children cared for at the orphans' hospice fall into three categories:

- poor children, born in a maternity hospital, but whose destitute parents were forced to abandon them;
- foundlings, presumed to be illegitimate;
- orphans or those whose parents are incarcerated.

Children in the last two categories wore a numbered collar and were cared for by the Hôtel-Dieu until the age of 12. Those in the first category are, as far as possible, placed with families who receive remuneration in exchange. At the time of the Sanitat, the children were trained and worked in the hospital's workshop. Things changed at Hôpital Saint-Jacques: the youngsters were supposed to apprentice with a foster family, but it seemed, in the early days, that this practice was less beneficial to the children than what the Sanitat had offered. Sanitary conditions at the hospice, although better than at the Sanitat, remained difficult: in 1836, half the children suffered from chronic illness. Until 1860, when hygiene improved and the smallpox vaccine became widely available, mortality hovered between 11% and 12% a year. In 1860, boarders became known as wards; the hospital welcomed 543 children aged 12 to 21, 460 of whom were placed with craftsmen during the day to learn a trade (mostly domestic service). The service remained active until 1955 when the children were taken in by the Foyer départemental de l'enfance.

Home for the hearing-impaired

Around 1834–1835, the municipality of Nantes obtained permission from the Loire-Inférieure General Council to transfer the school for the deaf and dumbfounded by René Dunan to the Saint-Jacques General Hospice. On August 1, 1835, the school's official status was changed to that of a "departmental institution". On March 23, 1840, the hospice's administrative commission drew up internal bylaws for the deaf-mute establishment. In 1850, Louis Cailleau, a brother of the Saint-Gabriel congregation, became the principal of the school. He obtained from Ferdinand Favre's municipality the purchase of the La Persagotière estate, to which the pupils were transferred on November 15, 1856.

Branch hospital

In 1848, the arrival in Nantes of the railway line from Tours to Saint-Nazaire led to an influx of wounded and sick, which the Hôtel-Dieu, already overcrowded and in poor condition, could not cope with. Around a hundred patients were transferred to Saint-Jacques. Directly dependent on the Hôtel-Dieu, the part of Saint-Jacques used in this way became known as the "succursal hospital", and after 1850 was home to around a thousand patients. To cope, the head physician at Saint-Jacques, who was then assisted by two student interns, was assigned exclusively to the care of the insane and was assisted by two physician's assistants, while two other physicians took charge of patients transferred from Hôtel-Dieu.

Religious

Before the Revolution, nuns assisted internees. Replacing them with salaried servants posed an insurmountable financial problem for the Republican administration. This factor, combined with the nuns' recognized competence in the field and Napoleon Bonaparte's political will to obtain religious peace, led to the return of the religious to the hospices. For the Hôtel-Dieu and Sanitat de Nantes, it was in 1803 that the administration called on the Daughters of Wisdom of Saint-Laurent-sur-Sèvre.

In 1840, they were hired on a contractual basis. At Hôpital Saint-Jacques, their role was to help care for the sick, prepare and distribute medicines, ensure discipline, distribute clothing, and teach the children. The hospital's Mother Superior is responsible for recruiting and dismissing staff (after approval by the administrative commission), and nurses and employees are under her direction. Transfers of personnel from one department to another depend on the Mother Superior.

The sisters are still attached to their congregation and sometimes leave their posts at the behest of the Superior of the Saint-Laurent-sur-Sèvre convent, which upsets hospital operations. Nevertheless, the role of the Daughters of Wisdom remained predominant in the hospital's various departments until World War II, except the pharmacy, where the technical nature of the preparations meant that the sisters were no longer in charge shortly after the hospital opened.

Respect for residents' freedom of conscience was enshrined in the hospital's rules, but proselytizing was unavoidable: one patient complained of having suffered reprisals for refusing to comply with a religious rite. There were no lay nurses until 1906 when hospice recruitment was opened up to graduates of the very recent Nantes nursing school, which opened in 1903. The sisters' undeniable dedication was no longer enough to ensure their dominance of the hospital. They therefore opted to take the nursing diploma, and by 1907, more than half the graduates were nuns. In 1923, a sister became director of the nursing school.

By 1920, there were 89 nuns at Saint-Jacques, but recruitment to the order was declining, and the sisters were gradually giving up responsibility for the departments. As a sign of the times, staff unions were formed in 1936, causing unrest among the nuns. Their influence was revived in 1940 when they were entrusted with social services for the sick. The last nuns were integrated into the hospital staff in 1973.

Since 1835, another religion has lived in the hospital, this time with a religious mission: the almoner. He was responsible for Catholic worship, religious instruction for children, and funerals for the needy.

Management

Two people are responsible for managing the facility. For administrative matters, the first appointee is Athénas Pitre. A head physician was appointed to monitor the health of the hospice's residents. As the establishment was created under the influence of Esquirol, he took advantage of his prestige to appoint one of his pupils, Camille Bouchet (1801–1854), to head Saint-Jacques. Bouchet had run the Charenton asylum for a few months and had the rare distinction of having devoted his residency exclusively to psychiatry. His predecessor, Dr. Treluyer, had no training in psychiatry and devoted little of his time to the hospice. Camille Bouchet was more involved and innovative. Until 1850, he was assisted by two student interns. With the arrival of patients from the Hôtel-Dieu, Bouchet was assigned exclusively to the care of the insane and was joined by two medical assistants, while two other doctors took charge of the other patients.

Staff

The mentally ill were cared for by a doctor, who initially looked after the hospital's three hospices and three student interns. In the men's ward, these specialists were supported by guards, of whom there were fifteen in 1845. Some were salaried employees, ex-convicts, gendarmes, the unemployed, or peasants, hired in the surrounding area for their physical strength. Their physical strength gave them the ability to subdue the agitated. Psychiatric training was non-existent until 1935, when Dr. Louis Corman, assisted by a qualified nurse, provided basic training in anatomy, physiology, and basic nursing care. The women's ward was staffed by women (17 in 1845), under the direction of a sister of the Daughters of Wisdom.

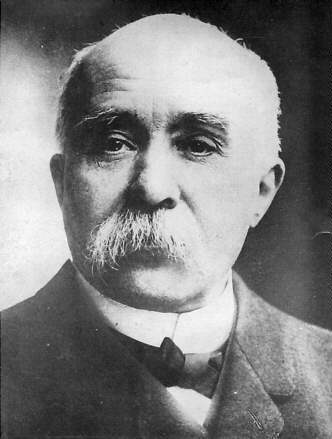
Georges Clemenceau

At first, the appointment of student interns was left to the discretion of the head physician. From 1859 onwards, interns in the insane ward were supposed to be chosen according to the same rules as in other hospitals, but personal, social, or political considerations came into play in many cases. Pupil interns are responsible for ensuring that the doctor's prescriptions are followed, and they perform a few routine procedures (bloodletting, dressings, scarification) as autopsies. Their conduct was far from irreproachable in the eyes of the administrators, as in the case of Georges Clemenceau, who avoided dismissal only because those in charge "suggested" to the father of the future minister that his son be withdrawn from the establishment.

To relieve overcrowding at the Hôtel-Dieu, a pharmacy annex was created in Saint-Jacques in 1848. The pharmacist was housed, heated, and lit by his employer, and even fed from 1850 onwards. The administration subsequently appointed two substitute pharmacists. In 1837, the administration created the position of bursar at Hôpital Saint-Jacques, alongside that of Hôtel-Dieu.

Employees were under the authority of the Mother Superior, who could decide on internal transfers: someone working in the bakery could, a few years later, become a psychiatric nurse (with the agreement of the alienist physician). Men and women work separately. Wages are low, but food and accommodation are free. There are no restrictions on working hours or vacations. The sisters granted staff a half-day's rest each week. In 1820, a pension fund was set up, funded by a deduction from salaries. On request, hospital employees were granted the right to become hospice residents once they became too old to work.

==== Developments from 1844 to 1914 ====
In 1844, the land of La Gréneraie, to the east of the hospital, was acquired. There, a farm was built and began operations with a workforce made up largely of able-bodied old people and quiet lunatics. By 1935, 70 people were still working on the farm, which ceased to operate after the Second World War. The farm housed cows, pigs, poultry, and a horse to pull the hospital hearse. Around 1885, the Count of Novion built a manor house on adjoining land, the Hôtel de la Gréneraie, which was acquired by Hôpital Saint-Jacques in 1914. It was used as a residence for the chief physicians, and later as a training center for nursing staff.

The insane population increases. Until 1859, it was possible to admit a family member for the sole reason that they represented a nuisance or a maintenance cost deemed too high, a reason that could be used by the mayor of the commune of residence. In 1855, the Prefect of Loire-Atlantique called all mayors to order, and in 1859 a prefectural decree tightened the grounds for internment. Only those presenting a danger to public order, or physically endangering those around them, could be admitted.

The insane ward was designed to house 400 people, but by 1862 it was accommodating 600. The reopening of the Hôtel-Dieu in 1863 was not enough to relieve Saint-Jacques. The idea was to create a "colonie hospice", a branch of the hospital far from the city, to house "non-dangerous lunatics, as well as foundlings raised in the countryside and destitute or infirm old people". The plan for the new facility was inspired by that of the Hôpital Saint-Jacques. After the failure of this project, expansion work on the existing pavilions was undertaken, but was insufficient.

In 1869, Hôpital Saint-Jacques was the third-largest hospice in France, after Paris and Lyon. At that time, it had 2,716 beds. Overcrowding also affected the old people's homes, for which two new buildings were constructed in 1866 and 1872.

In 1878, the psychiatric department inaugurated the Pavillon Bleu. This building contained cells for the agitated, a refectory, a meeting room for patients, and fifty additional beds. It owes its name "blue" to the psychiatrists' decision to paint everything blue, including the windows, as this color was supposed to be soothing.

The discovery of the role of microbial contagion in epidemics led, in 1882, to the emergency construction of two wooden barracks during a smallpox epidemic. This temporary facility was used in 1884 to isolate patients suffering from cholera, and later all contagious patients at Hôtel-Dieu, despite protests from residents. The barracks, which were used for various purposes over the years, were not demolished until 1970. After several cases of smallpox infection were reported in patients who had been admitted with benign illnesses, the construction of new buildings was considered. A plan to build a residence on boats in the middle of the Loire, which would have been too reminiscent of the drownings at Nantes, was rejected. Tents were also considered.

Thanks to a bequest received in 1889, a building for indigent convalescents was constructed in 1895. Known as "La Convalescence", it housed the nursing school after the Hôtel-Dieu was destroyed in 1943 and until 1968 when it was demolished to allow construction of the city's southern highway.

With the number of insane inmates rising steadily and the cost of building a new asylum too high, extension work was undertaken between 1898 and 1911.

==== World War I ====
During the war, Nantes, far from the battlefields, was a city that took in the wounded. The Broussais Army Hospital, located in the Doulon district and opened before the start of the war, was saturated. On October 30, 1914, eight wooden barracks were built on the grounds of the Saint-Jacques hospital. The whole complex formed "Hôpital complémentaire 57", named Hôpital Baur in honor of a French army doctor and colonel who was killed during the Battle of the Marne. With 414 beds in 1918, the hospital took in some 12,000 wounded in four years. An auxiliary tent was erected, and the rehabilitation department moved into the Saint-Jacques hospital farm. The Baur Hospital barracks were destroyed in 1919.

==== Interwar period ====
Between 1931 and 1932, in a shorter than usual timeframe, the "Pavillon Montfort" was built, symmetrically to "La Providence". It was intended as a medical service for the elderly and surgery. A debate ensued on the possibility of allocating it entirely to surgery, to open it up to non-residents. This option was not taken up, as Saint-Jacques still only offered this type of care to boarders or internees between the wars. When the pavilion opened in 1934, the first two floors were used to house free boarders, while the two upper floors were used for surgery.

The project to build a pavilion for contagious diseases took shape with work carried out between 1933 and 1935, enabling the construction of a building. By the end of the twentieth century, the building would be used by the University Psychiatry Department.

In 1939, living conditions were difficult for the inmates of the psychiatric hospital. An avant-garde establishment when it opened, Saint-Jacques has changed little since then, and the psychiatric wards are considered to be in a deplorable state.

==== World War II ====
As early as 1929, Saint-Jacques staff were invited to take passive defense training courses, which became compulsory in 1938. When France went to war against Germany in September 1939, memories of the previous conflict prompted the hospital management to dig shelter trenches in the main courtyard, request authorization to purchase 4,500 masks to protect against asphyxiating gases and create a washing center for mustard gas victims.

The German army considered using Saint-Jacques as a military hospital but abandoned the project. During the Occupation, the mortality rate among the hospital's residents rises due to food shortages and an upsurge in tuberculosis cases. Following Operation Chariot in Saint-Nazaire in March 1942, the threat of Allied bombing became more acute. The destruction of the Pirmil bridge, cutting off communication between the south and north of the Nantes conurbation, would deprive the southern Loire region of rapid access to a hospital. The plan was, therefore, to equip Saint-Jacques with medical and surgical departments open to outside patients.

In May 1943, staff member Jean-Baptiste Péneau tried to set up a French Resistance corps within the hospital. The Alphonse Buckmaster network was formed. After five weeks of sabotage and intelligence gathering, notably concerning the Salorges warehouses on Quai de la Fosse, Péneau's deputy is arrested by the Gestapo on denunciation. Tortured, he revealed information that led to the arrest of all but one member of the group, who managed to escape. Five died in Buchenwald concentration camp. The information gathered by the network undoubtedly contributed to the success of the operation to destroy the Salorges depot on September 23, 1943.

On September 16, 1943, Allied bombing raids on Nantes led to the destruction of the Hôtel-Dieu hospital. The victims of the bombs were taken in by the Hôpital Saint-Jacques, where the 3,000 insane and elderly patients were grouped to make room. On September 23, a new bombardment hit the city; a few projectiles fell on the Saint-Jacques grounds but failed to explode. Saint-Jacques became the city's main hospital until the new Hôtel-Dieu was opened, between 1964 and 19678. In November 1943, several departments were opened: two surgical departments, a medical clinic, a contagious diseases department, a maternity ward, a radiology and radiotherapy department, and other specialized services.

==== From 1944 to the end of the 20th century ====
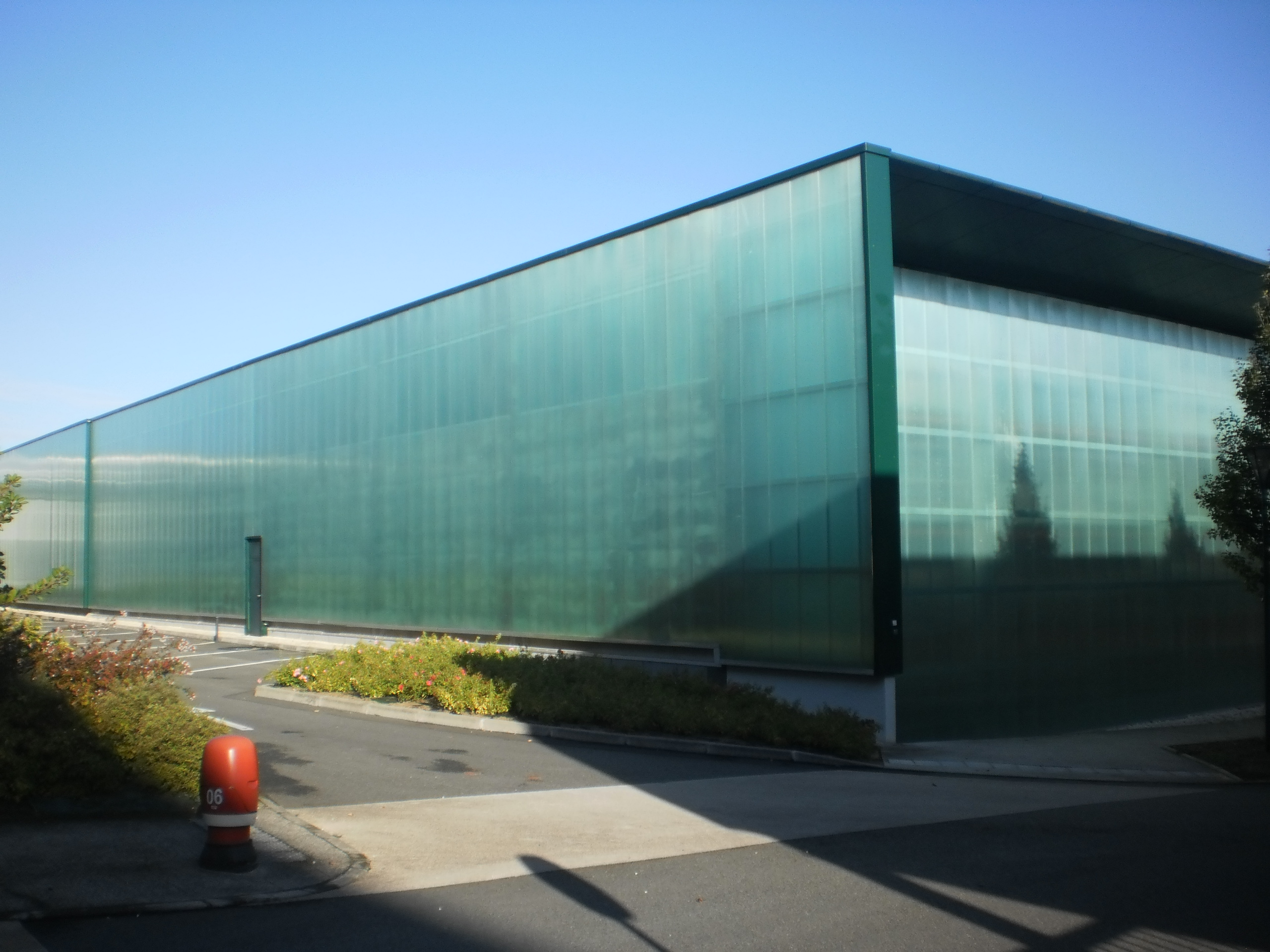
Modern buildings.

In 1944, to assume its role as the main hospital for the city of Nantes, Saint-Jacques underwent new construction: temporary barracks. The 30-bed dormitories still existed, as the premises were ill-suited to the creation of rooms with one, two, or four beds. The cramped conditions meant that the radiology and emergency departments were housed in unsuitable premises. Tuberculosis patients, who were numerous at the end of the war, overcrowded the hospital. Infected patients were housed in dilapidated premises, in the former Chantenay hospital, and even in the general medicine and surgery departments of Saint-Jacques, as the isolation of contagious patients proved impossible for lack of space.

New departments were created: burns (1952), intensive care (1958), traumatology, rheumatology, endocrinology, nephrology, anatomical pathology, blood transfusion center, and regional cancer center. They are sometimes housed in temporary barracks. The convalescent and relay pavilions were built. 1958 saw the introduction of "full-time" hospital practice for doctors: they devoted all their time to the hospital, and no longer had an outside practice. Premises had to be found to house their consulting rooms, secretariats, etc. This demand was once again met by the construction of temporary premises.

After 1956, the Nantes hospitals associated with the Faculty of Medicine became known as the University Hospital Center. Psychiatric wards accommodate up to 1,200 patients. The construction of the Pont-Piétin asylums in Blain and the Montbert asylums, together with the policy of externalizing care, relieved the hospital. In May 1964, the "mother and child" wing of the new Hôtel-Dieu opened. But it wasn't until October 16, 1967, 24 years after its destruction during the war, that Hôtel-Dieu was able to welcome its first patient in the central block, and surgical services, laboratories, etc. were moved there.

It wasn't until 1978 that the decision was taken to build a new hospital to the north of Nantes. The Minister of Health at the time was Simone Veil, and the Mayor of Nantes was Alain Chénard. The question arose as to the future of Saint-Jacques; it was envisaged to demolish it, sell the land for real estate projects, or rebuild the entire hospital. The choice was made to demolish the buildings vacated by the creation of a new hospital and rebuild more suitable ones, and to keep the historic Saint-Jacques hospital.

The project for a new hospital in Nantes takes shape with the opening of the Laennec Hospital in Saint-Herblain (a commune bordering Nantes). The opening of this hospital took away some of Saint-Jacques' activities, and the hospital refocused on psychiatry, geriatrics, and functional rehabilitation. In 1989, Saint-Jacques offered 1,151 beds in short-stay, medium-stay, long-stay, and psychiatry. Developments in psychiatric medicine have led to the opening of day hospitals in the city. As a result, the number of beds in the department fell from 600 to 375 in 1989.

== Architecture and decor ==
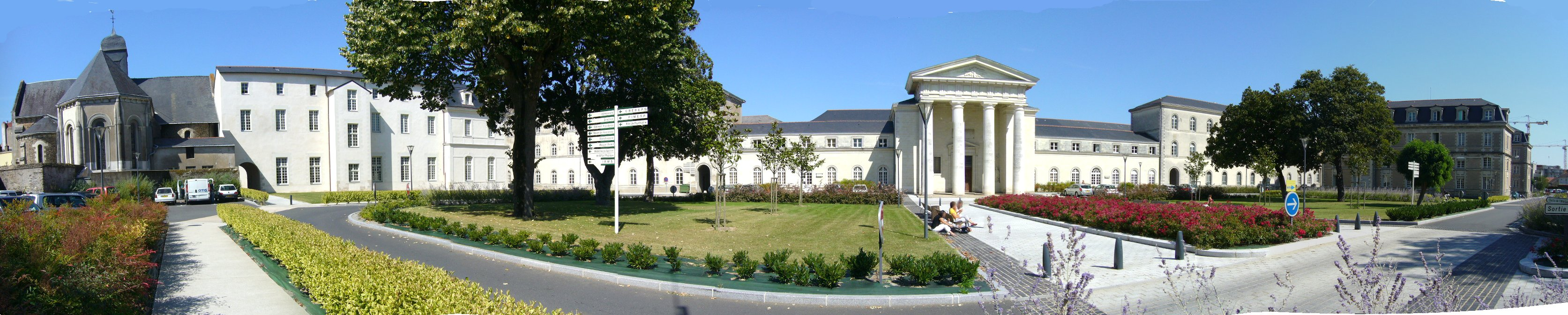
Overview.

=== La Providence ===
The Providence building houses a vaulted gallery that may have served as a refectory for the monks who rebuilt the priory in 1711.

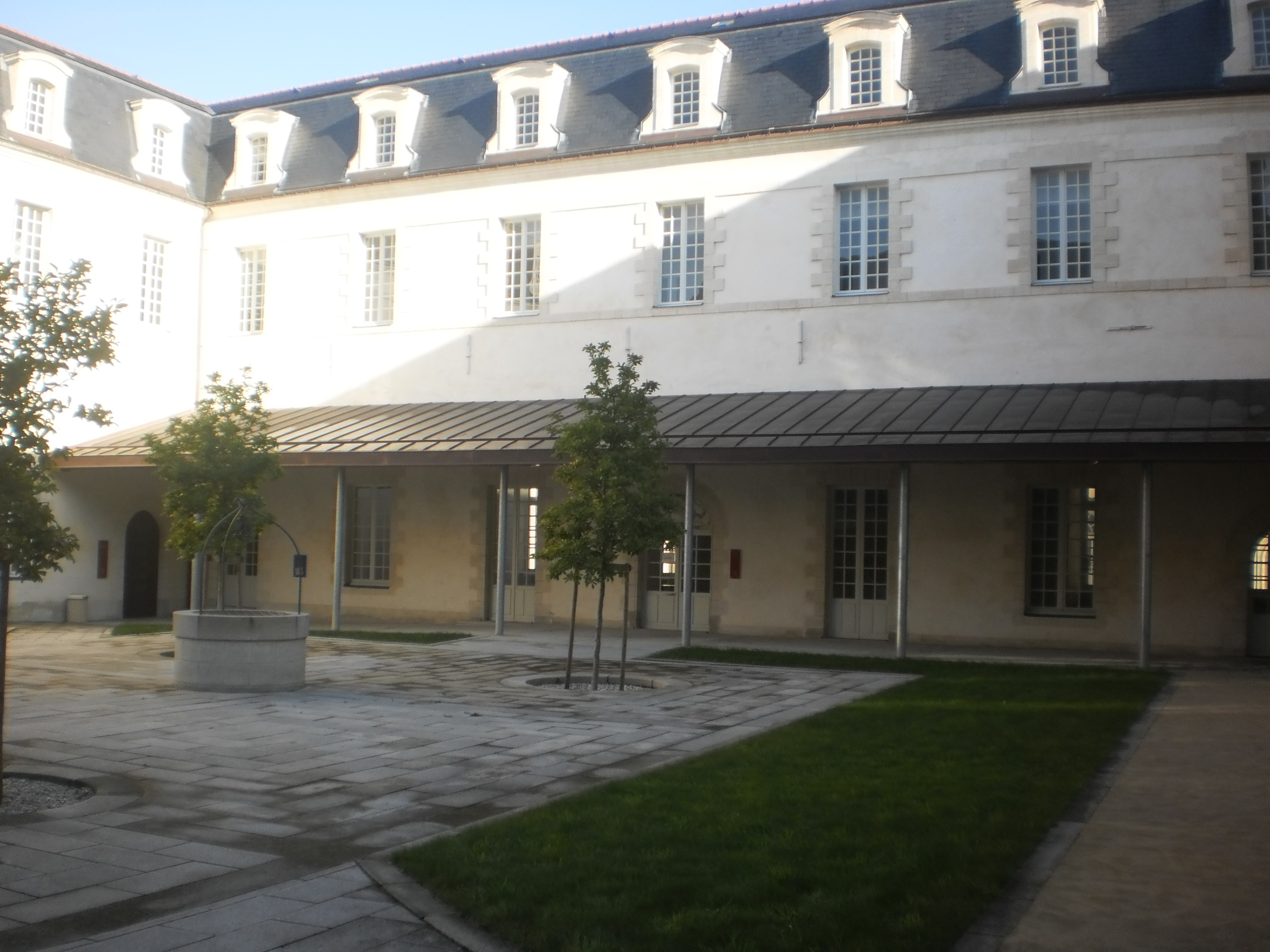
La Providence: inner courtyard.

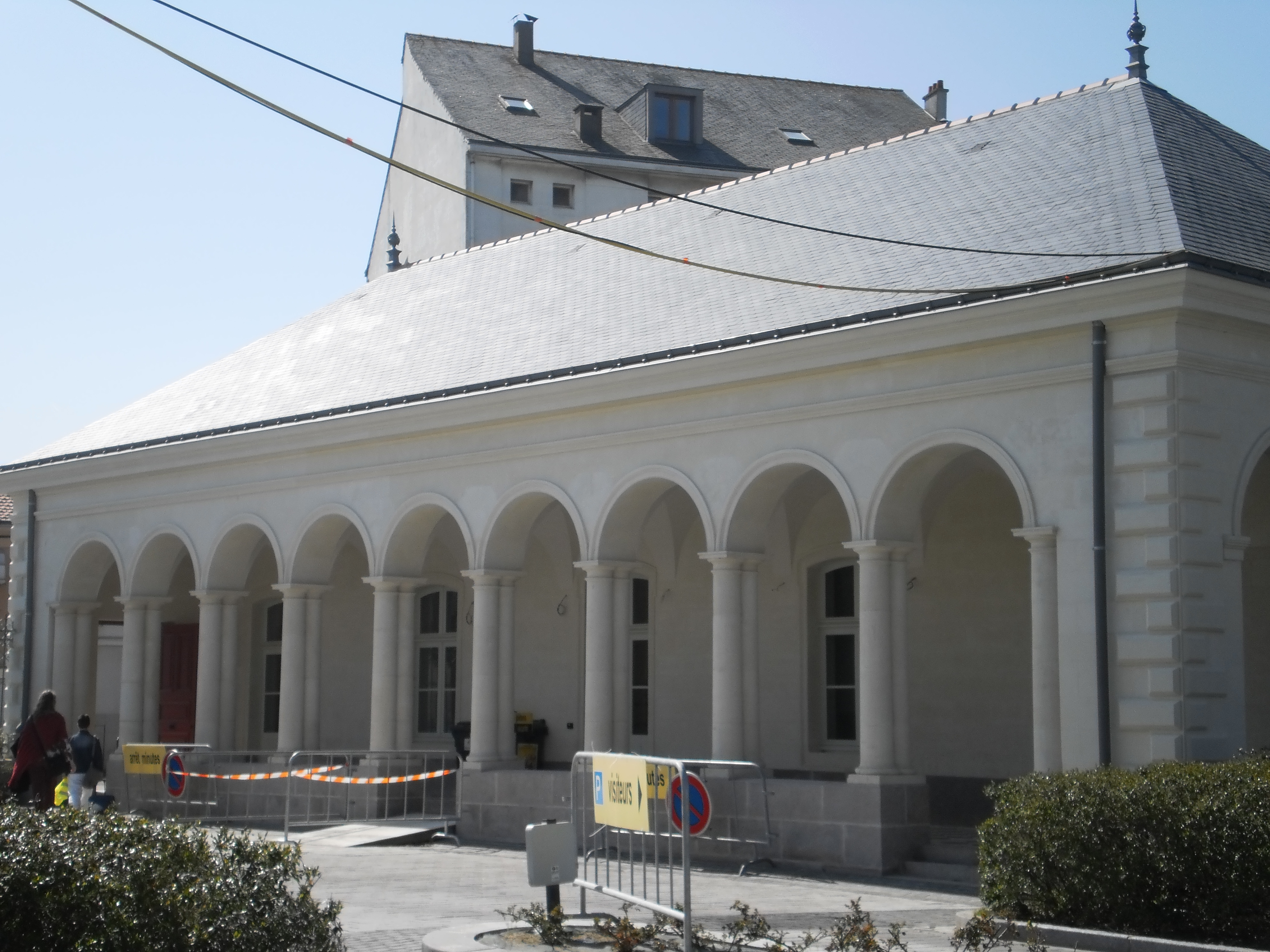
West side of the south entrance.

Entry

The two buildings flanking the southern entrance are listed as historic monuments.

Central buildings

The work of brothers Louis-Prudent and Constant Douillard, architects of the hospital from 1831, is inspired by neoclassical architecture. The site's designers applied their expertise to the building's medical purpose. The premises had to be functional, in line with the most advanced standards of the time in terms of psychiatry and care for the elderly. Around the chapel, parallel and perpendicular buildings are linked by galleries with Tuscan columns. One of the main features of the complex's design was its openness to the Loire River to the north.

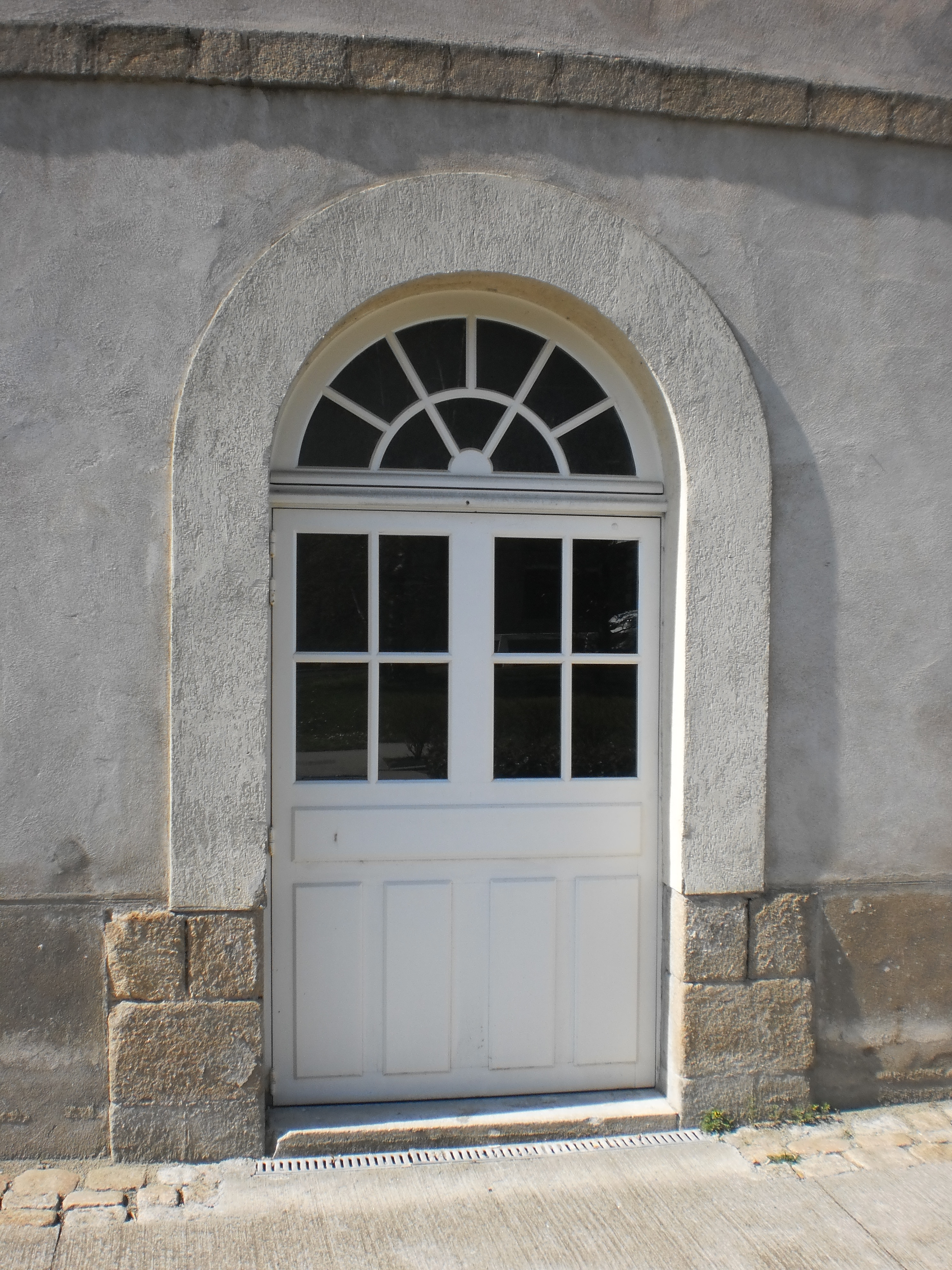
French window.

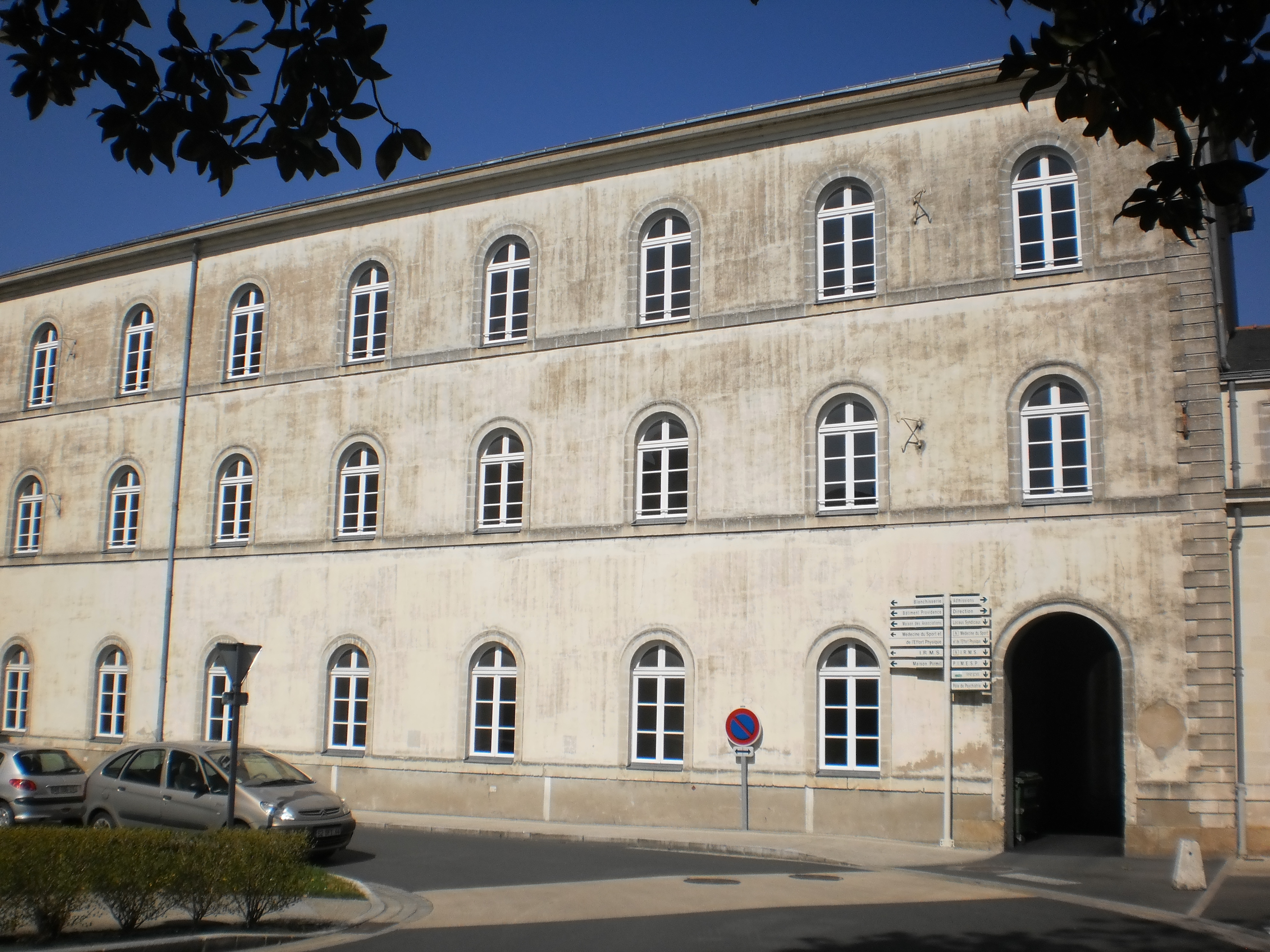
Building.

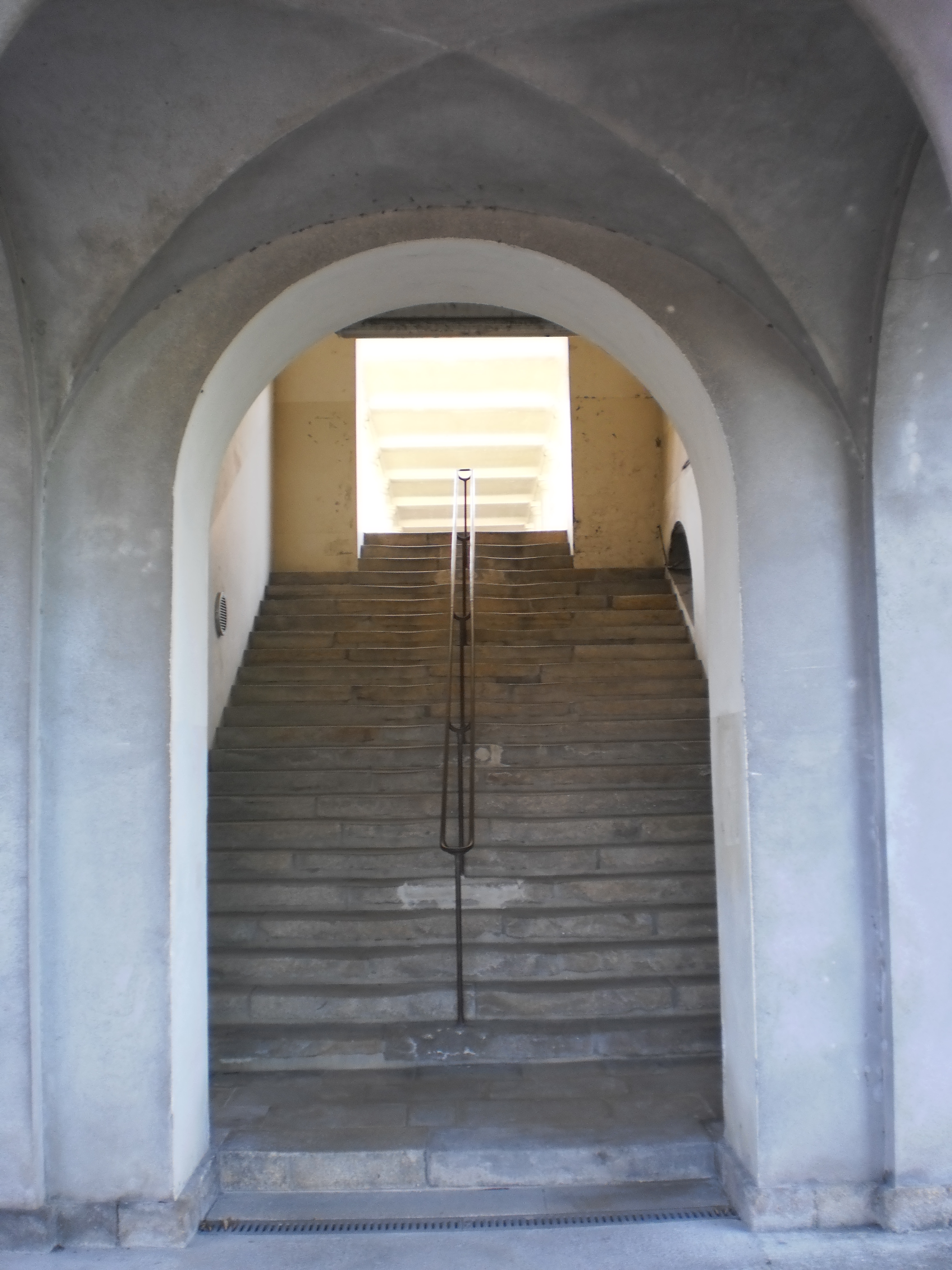
Staircase.

=== Pavillon Montfort ===
The Montfort pavilion, built in 1931–1932, is symmetrical with the Providence pavilion, following the central axis of the chapel.

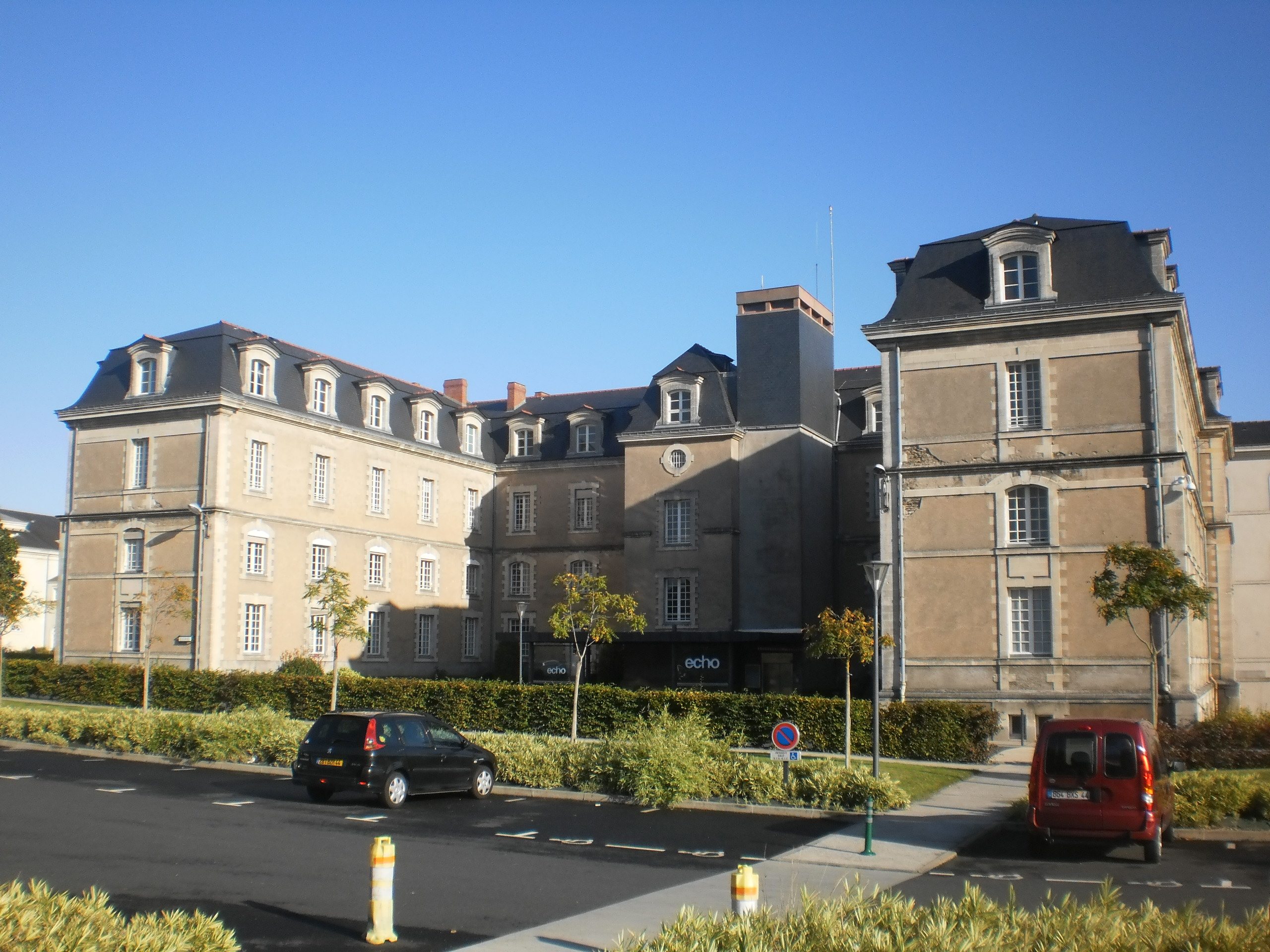
Pavillon Montfort.

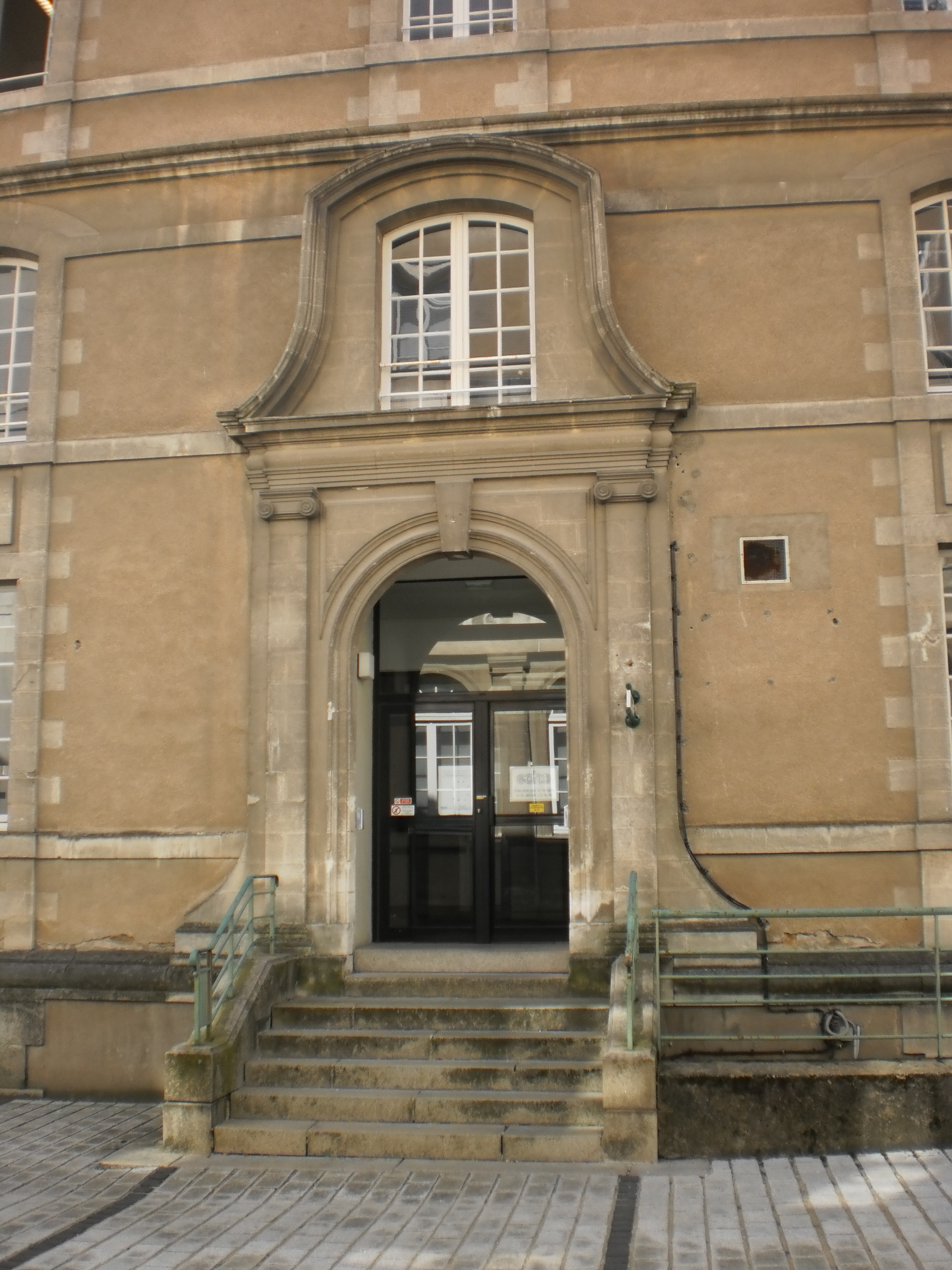
Door to the Montfort pavilion.

=== Chapel ===
The Greek Revival facade of the chapel, which occupies the center of the building opposite the hospital's main entrance, is a fine example of the Neoclassical style applied to a religious building.

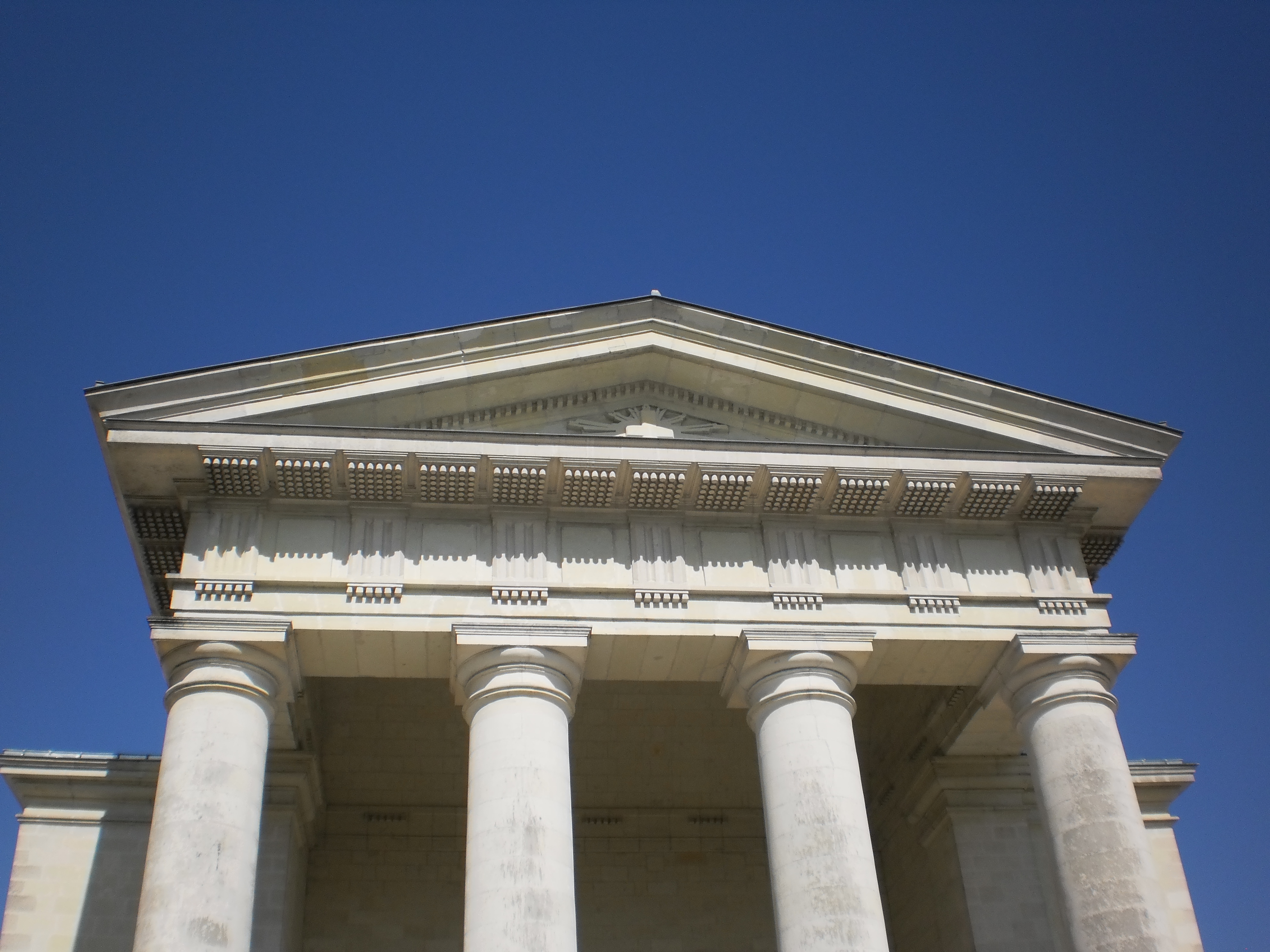
Pediment and frieze.

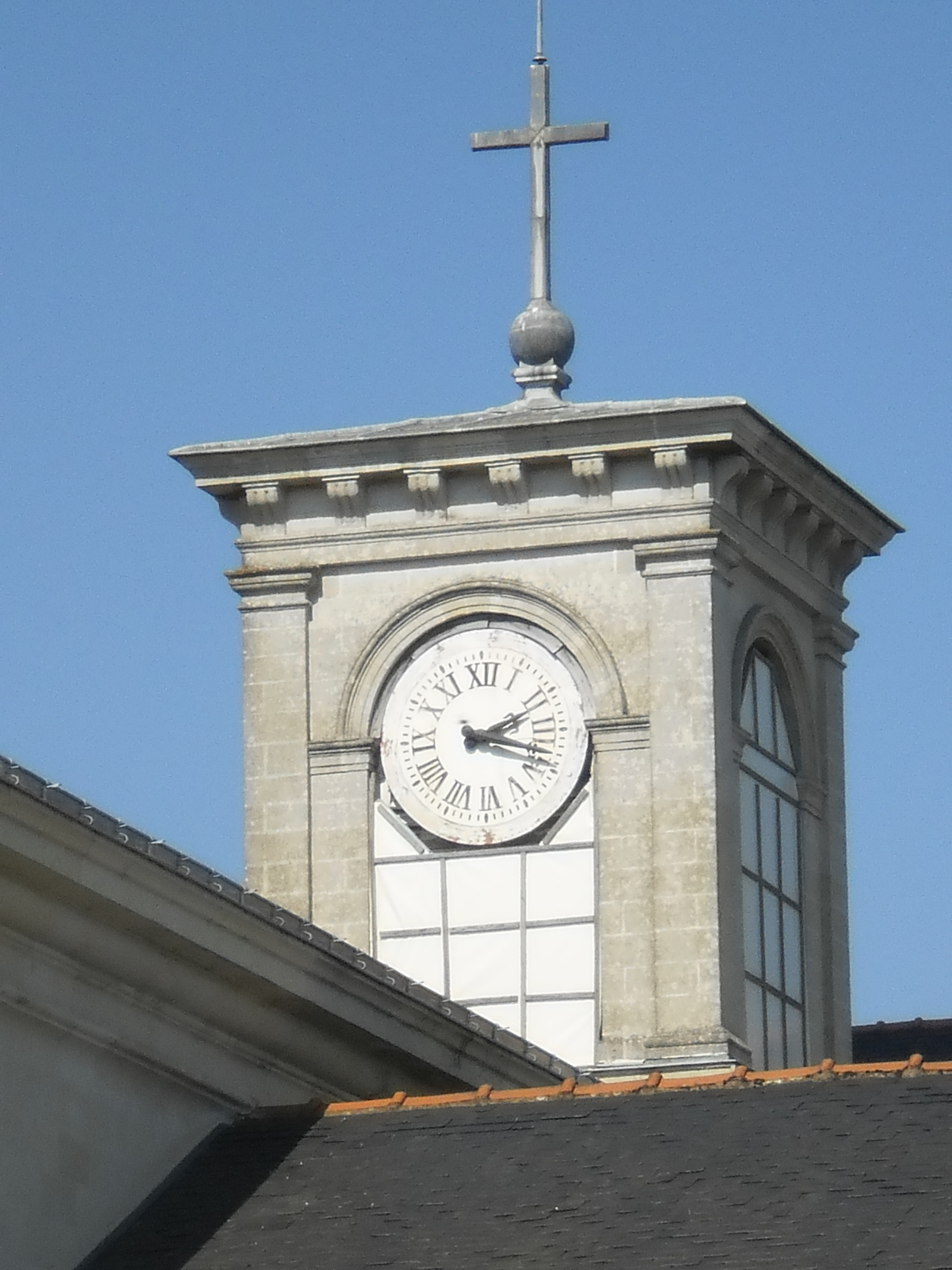
Bell tower.

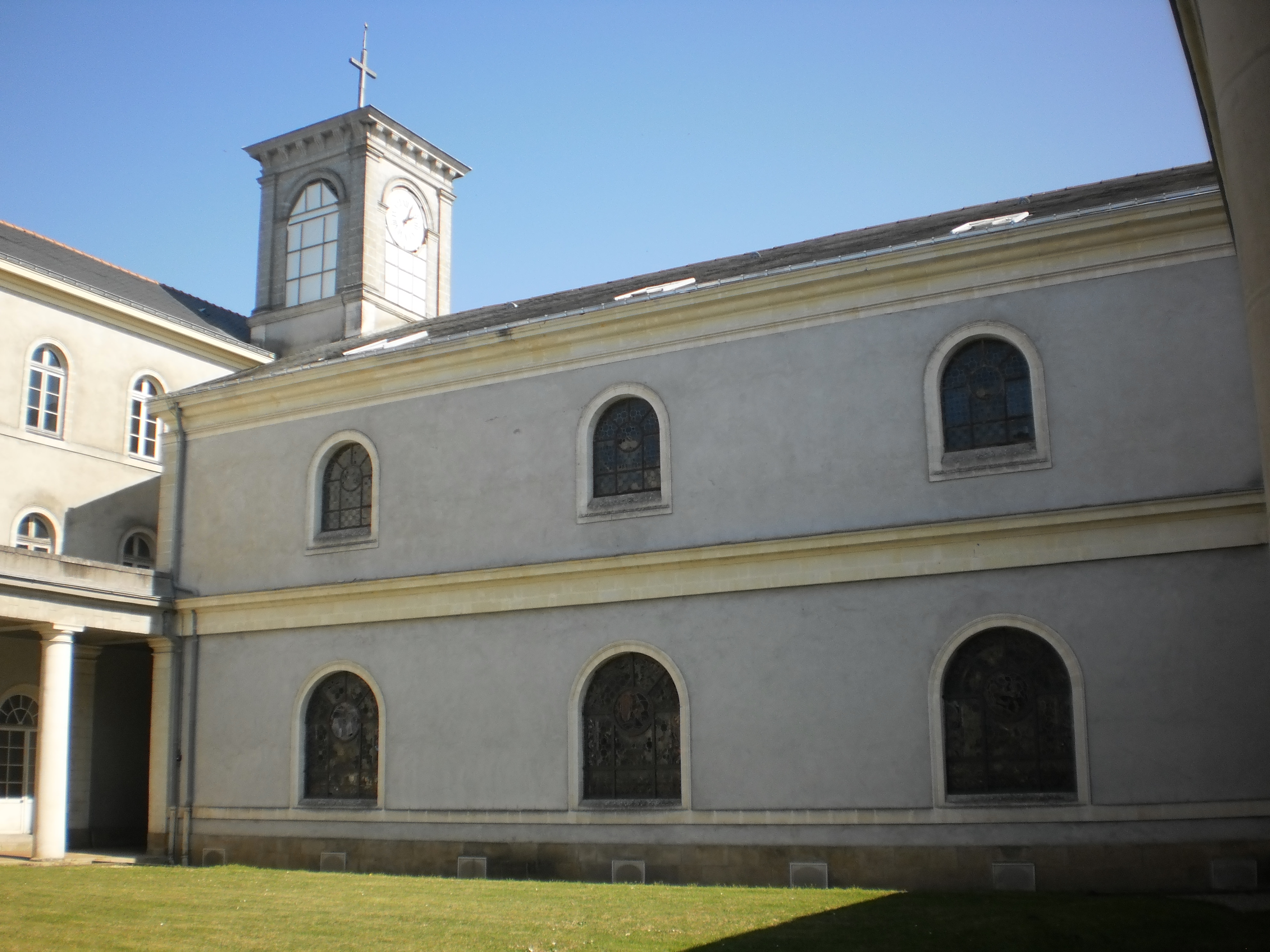
West facade.

The chapel contains 15th-century wooden stalls. They come from the Saint-Jacques de Pirmil church and were moved during its renovation in 1842. The stalls may have been commissioned by Bishop Thomas James. They are fitted with miséricordes from the same period, removable supports enabling monks to lean on them during long services. These elements are made of carved wood. The nave and choir of the chapel have an austere appearance, in keeping with the façade. In reference to the ancient Roman architect Vitruvius, the Douillard brothers designed two superimposed galleries. The columns supporting the upper gallery are made of wood and decorated with trompe-l'œil.

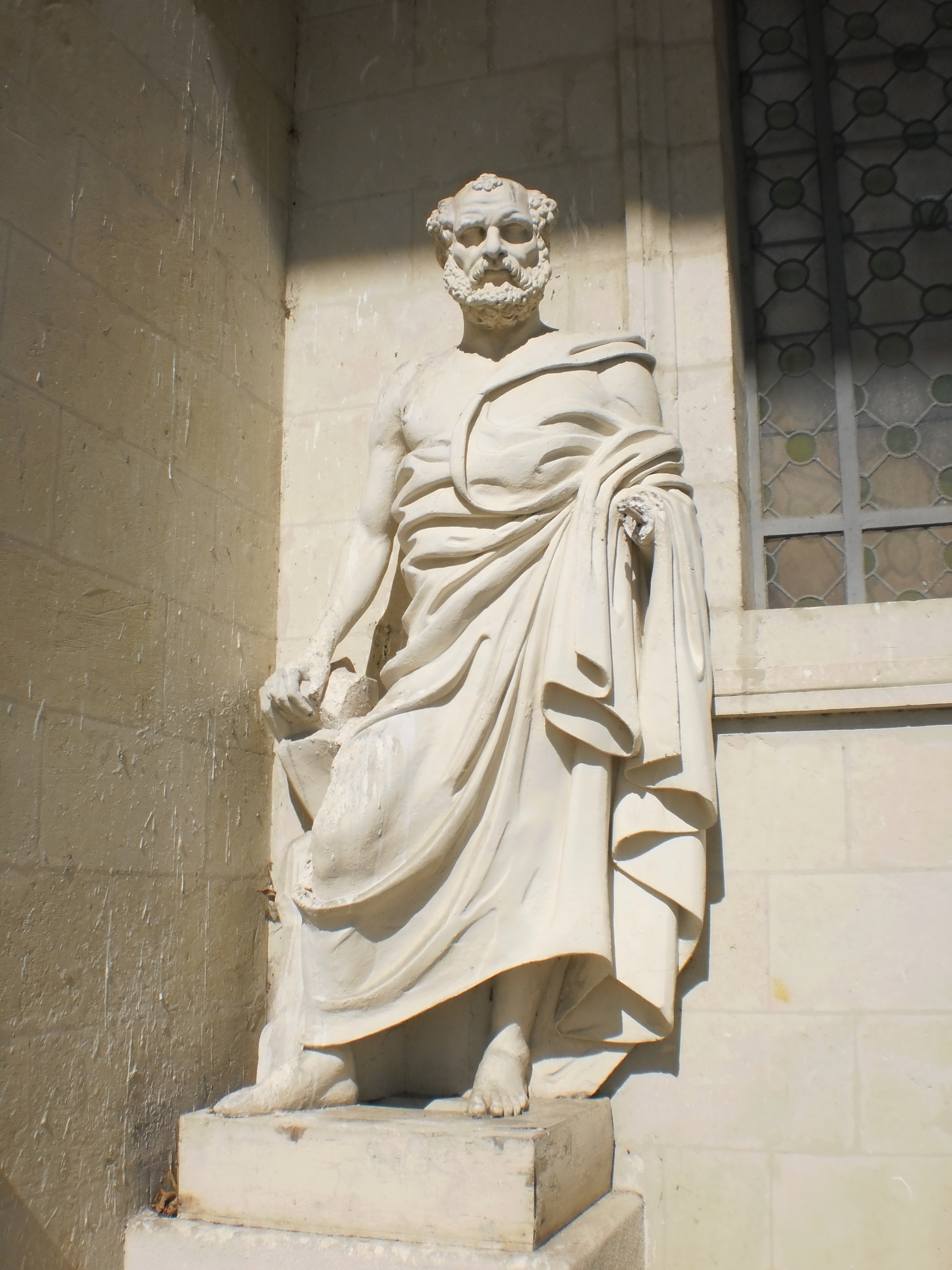
Statue.

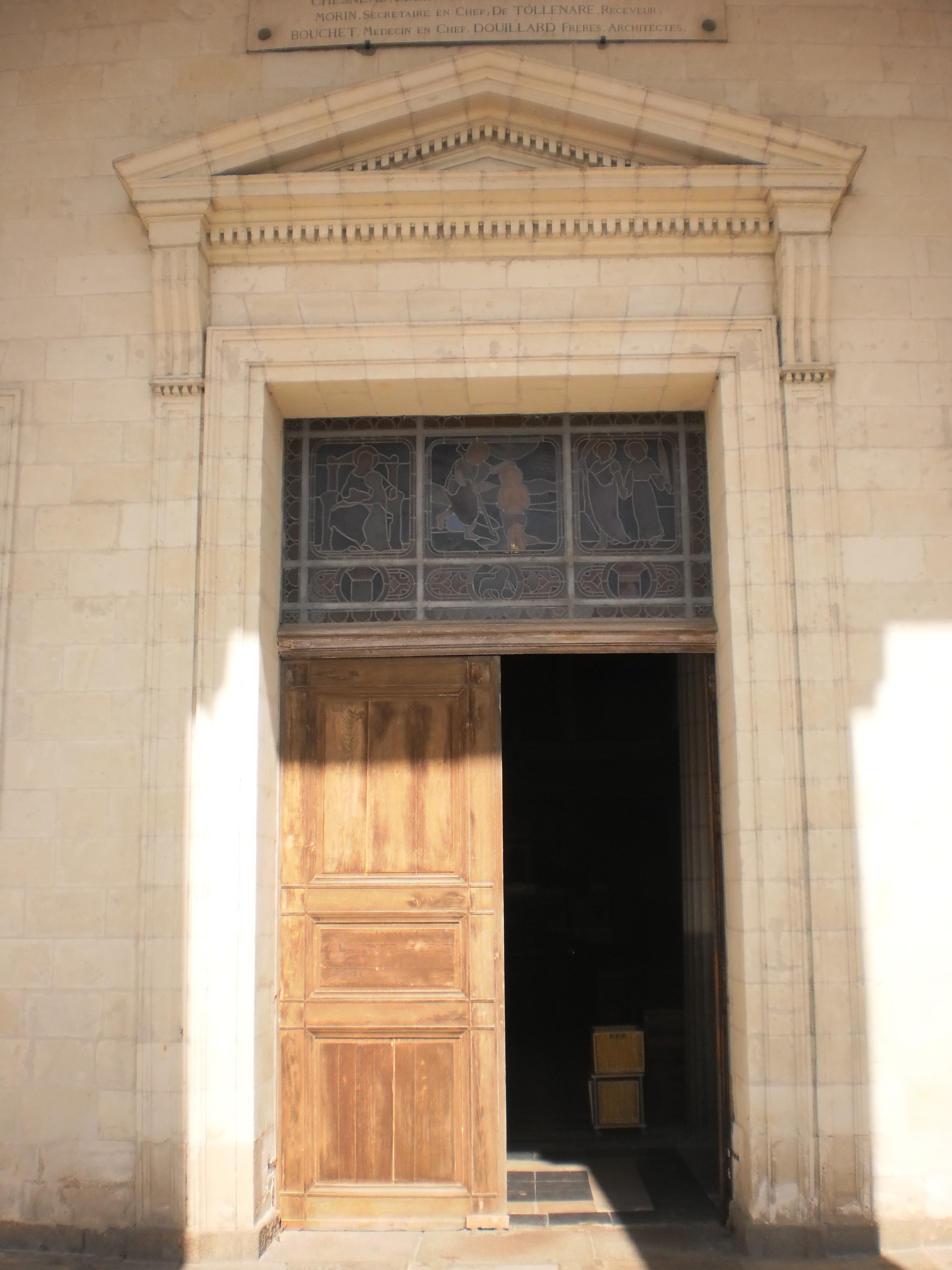
Entrance.

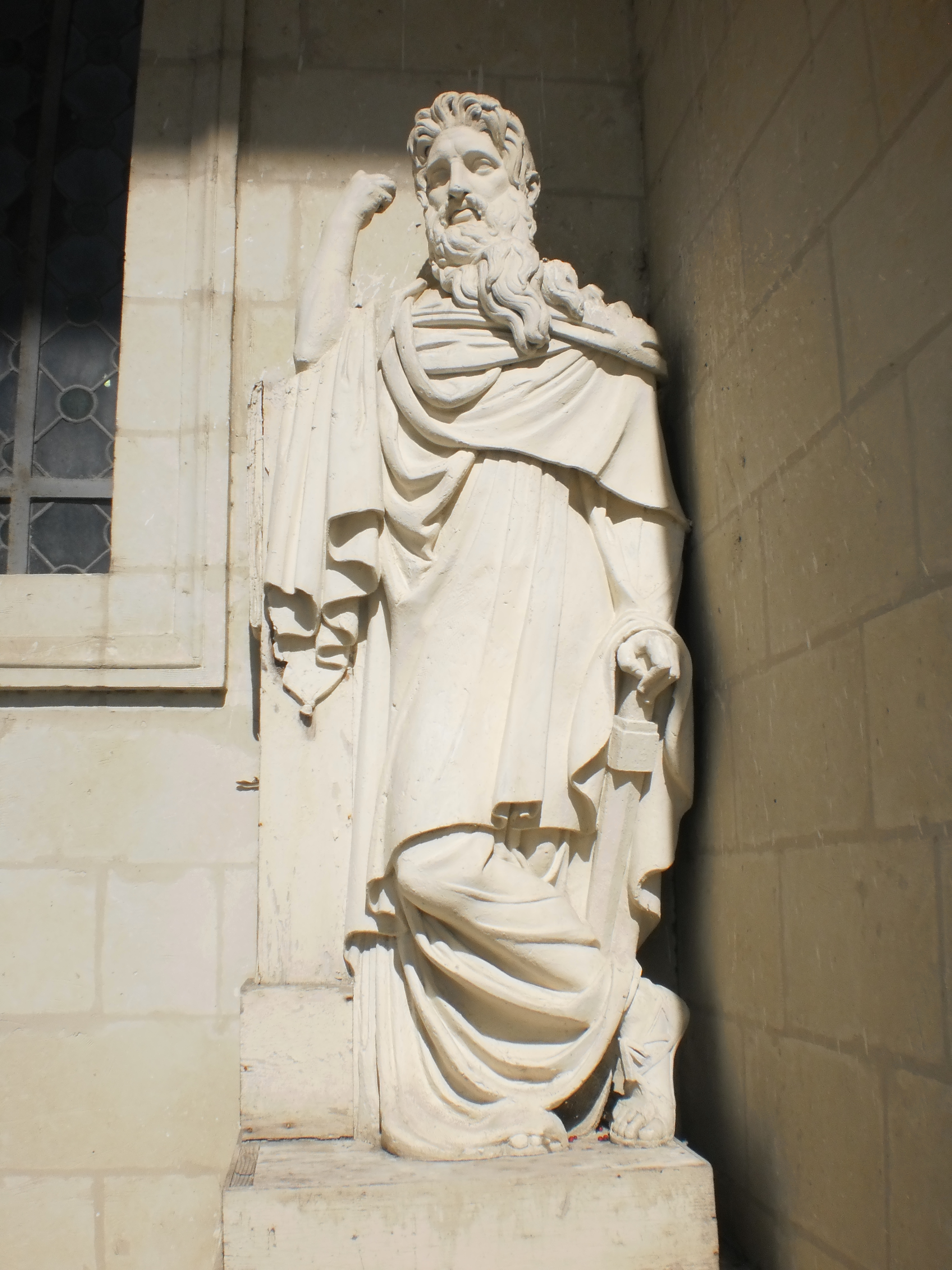
Statue.

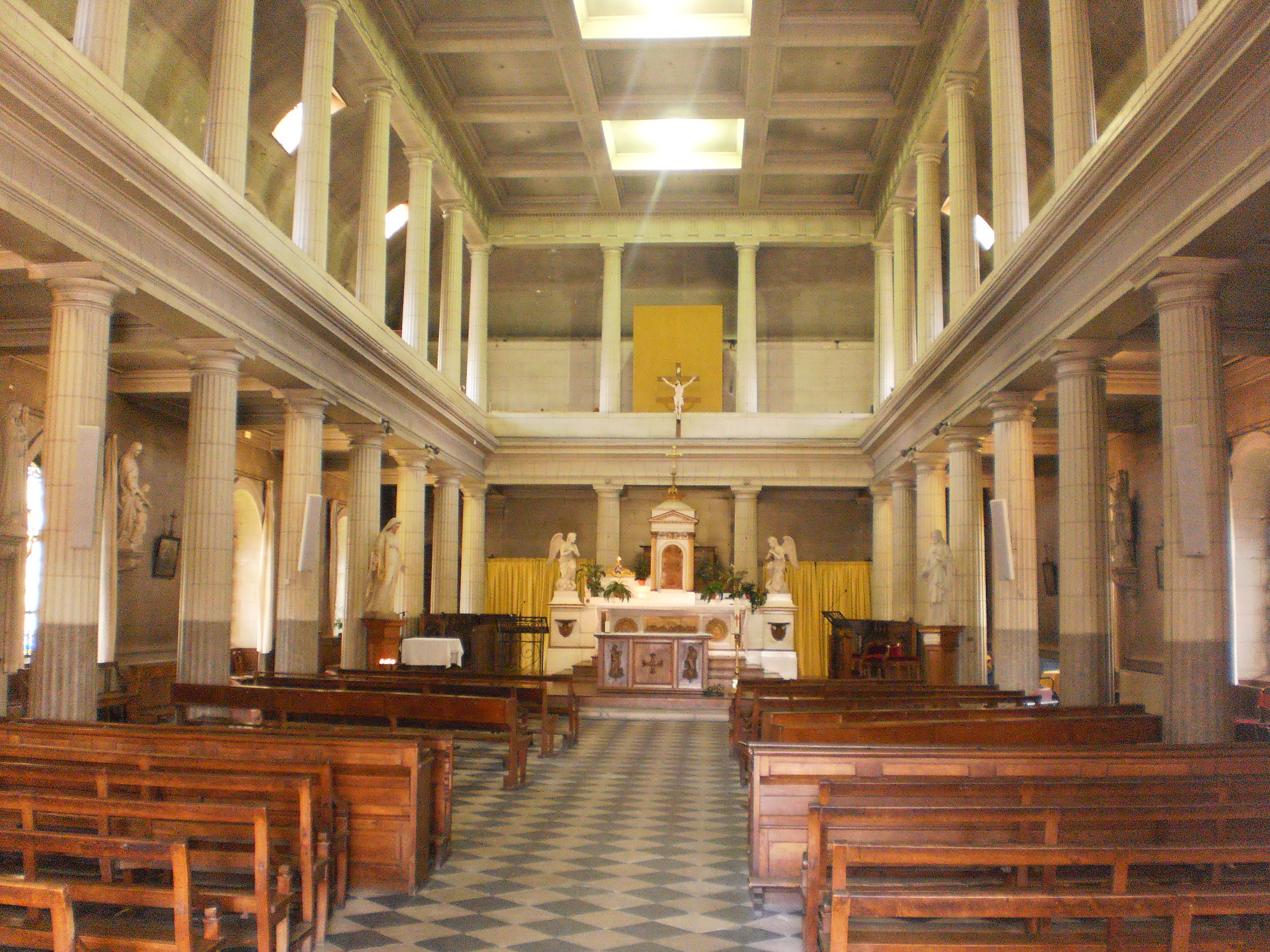
Nave and choir.

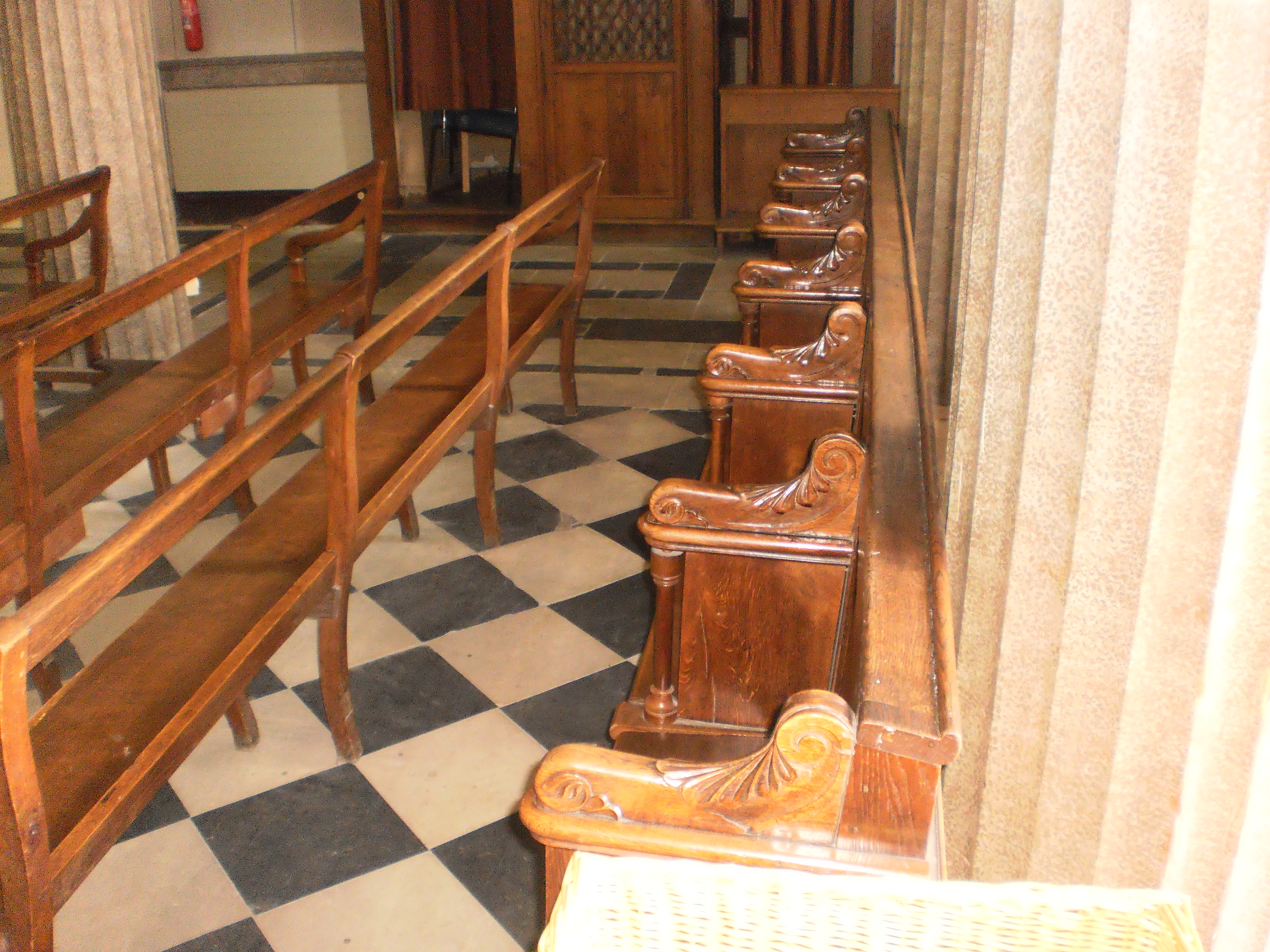
Bench.

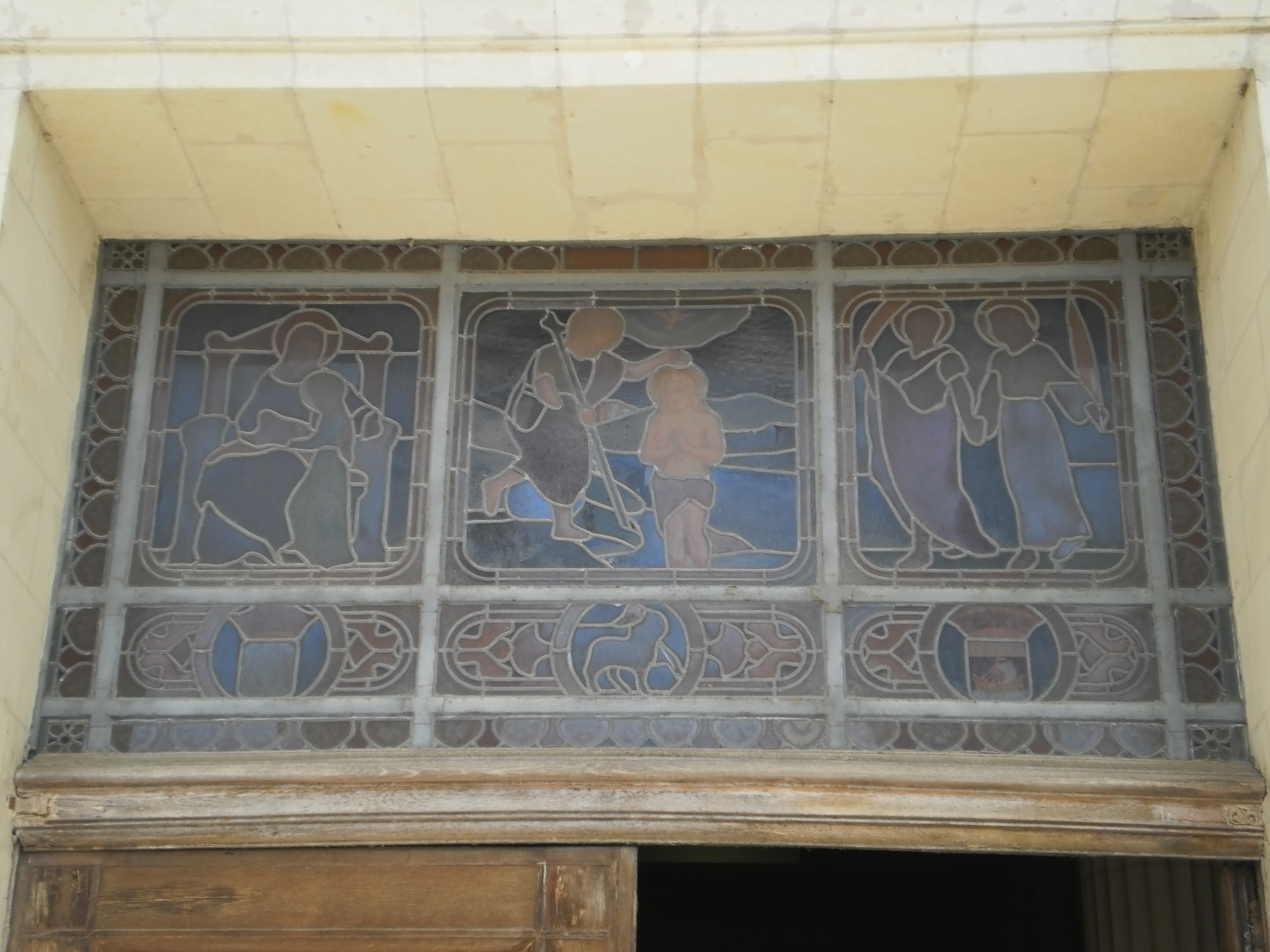
Stained glass.

=== Logistics platform ===
In 2006, the hospital's logistical needs led to the creation of a new building. The resolutely industrial tone chosen by the AIA architectural firm is counterbalanced by the aesthetics of the building envelope, made of aluminum and glass.

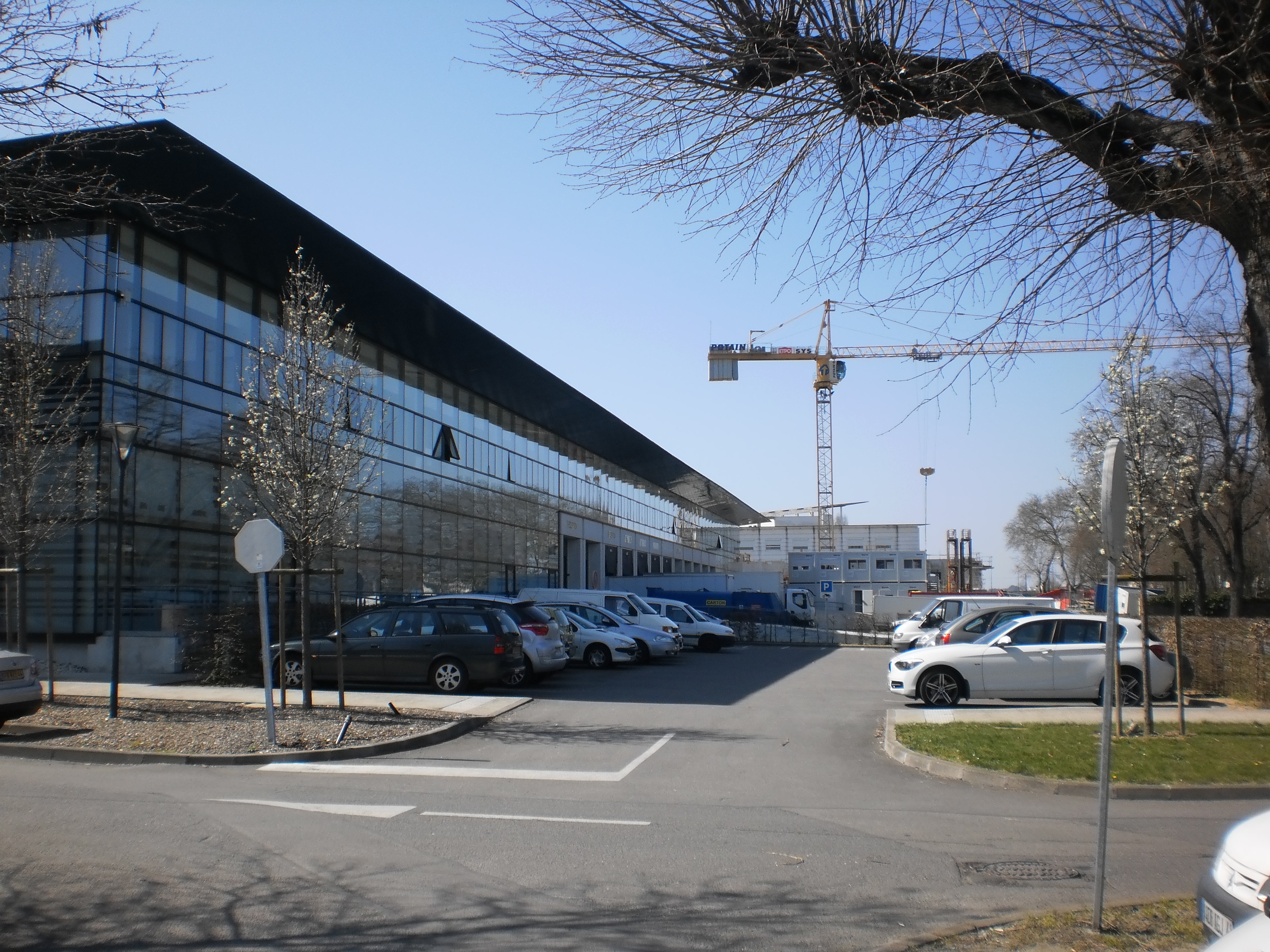
Parking in front of the logistics platform building.

Psychiatry Division

In 2009, the reorganization of the psychiatric center provided the opportunity for an architectural creation designed to link the heterogeneous parts of the complex, the fruit of a historical evolution carried out without concern for unity. Resolutely modern, the result is a seam between the northern and southern parts of the area. The layout, designed by GPAA architects, features a covered passageway inspired by the Passage Pommeraye in downtown Nantes. A set of colored ribbons running along the walls contributes to the homogeneity of the group of buildings.

== Hospital operations in the 21st century ==
=== General presentation ===
Hôpital Saint-Jacques is one of the seven establishments of the Nantes University Hospital, and is home to departments specializing in functional rehabilitation, psychiatry and geriatrics. It is also the site of the Nantes University Hospital's logistics center. As part of a university hospital center, Saint-Jacques is under the responsibility of a supervisory board which, in 2012, was chaired by Jean-Marc Ayrault, President of the Nantes urban community. The medical project is overseen by a board of around ten healthcare professionals. The General Manager is Christiane Coudrier. The general management is organized into five poles, while the healthcare offer is organized into six local platforms defined by a group of medical specialties. This system was introduced as part of a national reform of the organization of healthcare establishments, which began in 2005. Nantes University Hospital has opted to do away with site management.

=== Services ===
In addition to care services, the hospital is home to the Plateau des écoles, home to schools for nurses, care assistants, medical radiation technologists, etc.

Schematic plan of Hôpital Saint-Jacques.: A North door; B Movement lab/Sports medicine; C Addictology/Parenthood center; D Psychiatry sector 3; E Psychiatry sector 5; F Gerontology - Maison Pirmil; G Central stores; H Consultation Ship/pedo psychiatry; I Central Laundry; J Pimesp; K Chapel; L Associations, management; M Cravs; N Physical medicine/neurological rehabilitation; O Psychiatry Sector 1; P La Providence: administration - technical and logistics center; R Pavillon Montfort; S Reception, south entrance; T Plateau des écoles

=== Clinical and medical-technical services ===
==== Addictology ====
The addictology department cares for patients prone to alcoholism, smoking, drug addiction, or overindulgence in activities such as gambling or sexual practices.

The substance-related addictology department is known as the “Guillaume Apollinaire hospitalization unit”. In 2011, it was staffed by a doctor, a psychologist, a health executive, a nurse and a social worker, and was designed to care for drug, alcohol and medication users aged 16 and over.

The Lou Andreas-Salomé inpatient unit (named after a German woman of letters close to Sigmund Freud) takes in people aged 16 to 35 suffering from non-produced addiction (gambling addiction, cyberaddiction, eating disorders). In 2011, it was staffed by a social worker, a health executive, a dietician, sixteen nurses, two doctors and a psychologist.

==== Parenting Center of Nantes - Home ====
The Centre nantais de la parentalité is a child psychiatry service whose aim is to support the parent-child relationship and treat early developmental disorders. As part of this service, the Pierre-Janet pavilion at Hôpital Saint-Jacques houses the Home, a unit for pregnant women or women who have just given birth. The service aims to provide support to women in need of special assistance, either in the form of full-time hospitalization or day hospitalization. Specialists on the unit include child psychiatrists, a psychologist, a psychiatrist and a psychomotricist.

==== Resource center for assistance in dealing with perpetrators of sexual violence (Cravs) ====
The Pays de la Loire resource center for assistance in dealing with perpetrators of sexual violence is designed to inform and put health, legal, social, and educational professionals, as well as families, in touch with the legislation and care available to perpetrators of sexual violence. The Cravs are also responsible for training professionals in the care of these individuals.

==== Inter-sector child psychiatry hospitalization service ====
The Service of Intersectoriel Hospitalisation de Pedopsychiatrie (SHIP) is a service housed within the Saint-Jacques hospital, but which does not depend on the CHU.

With the SHIP, Hôpital Saint-Jacques is the only establishment offering child psychiatry beds in Loire-Atlantique. The SHIP has ten beds for the whole department, only one of which is an “emergency” bed. As the service is completely saturated several times a year, young patients are placed in adult services.

Its transfer to Bouguenais is planned for the end of 2012 when the Montbert Specialized Hospital Center (CHS) will move in. Child psychiatry inpatient capacity should then increase from 10 to 15 beds.

==== Gerontology - Geriatrics - Maison Pirmil ====
"Maison Pirmil" is the name given to a building designed by AIA (Architectes Ingénieurs Associés), for which planning permission was granted in 1991, construction began in 1993 and which opened in 1994. It is designed to accommodate elderly people whose health requires follow-up care or, for those who are physically or mentally dependent, long-term gerontological or geriatric care. In 2012, these services offered 24 and 160 beds respectively.

Nantes CHU's gerontology cluster is based in the Pirmil building. Like all divisions, it is multi-site. It manages short-stay units (Hôpital Nord Laennec and Hôpital Bellier), follow-up care units (Maison Pirmil, Hôpital Bellier and Maison Beauséjour), and long-term stays (Maison Pirmil, Maison Beauséjour, La Seilleraye (Carquefou)).

The CHU de Nantes geriatric mobile team, based at the Maison Pirmil, works at various CHU de Nantes sites, notably in emergency, and in the département, to meet the specific care needs of certain patients over 75 years of age.

==== Motion Analysis Laboratory ====
Attached to the Physical and Functional Medicine Division, this laboratory measures human movement and collects biomechanical data. Its results provide information to aid diagnosis and guide therapeutic choices. The laboratory's main area of research is quantified gait analysis. The laboratory's expertise in this field earned it accreditation in September 2011 from the European Society of Mouvement Analysis for Adults and Children.

==== Sports and exercise medicine ====
This department specializes in research into sports traumatology and the evaluation of physical capacities for medical reasons. Tests cover a wide range of fields. The department's training mission is aimed at students of medicine, physiotherapy, podiatry, and osteopathy, as well as those applying for the “brevet d'état d'éducation physique et culturisme”, nurses and general practitioners within the framework of the “capacité de médecine du sport”. Research into sports traumatology (muscular injuries, physical activity with prostheses, etc.), including research into the parameters of overtraining in professional athletes.

==== Physical medicine and neurological rehabilitation ====
Established in 1978, the Physical Medicine and Neurological Rehabilitation Department is dedicated to the treatment of people suffering from neurological impairment.

The center comprises several departments:

- a 30-bed spinal cord injury unit;
- The part-time hospitalization unit (neurological disorders) has 18-day beds and 5-week beds;
- The multi-purpose neurological rehabilitation unit (motor or cognitive disorders, bedsores, disability surgery, secondary complications following spinal cord injury) has 30 beds;
- The follow-up care unit (neurological disorders) has 30 beds
- the specific cerebrospinal cord unit has 30 beds for people suffering from cerebral disorders following trauma, vascular accident, or neurological damage.

==== Médecine physique, réadaptation locomotrice et réadaptation gériatrique ====
The re-education and functional rehabilitation center has been open since 1978. It is housed in the Saint-Jacques hospital and occupies four floors. It offers balneotherapy and a gymnasium adapted for basketball, archery, and table tennis. In 2011, it was staffed by around a hundred nursing aides and nurses, twenty physiotherapists, fifteen doctors, fifteen occupational therapists, a psychologist, three sports teachers, and a social worker. A therapeutic apartment enables disabled patients to prepare for their discharge. Among the activities on offer, the discovery of candidacy is an innovative one.

The center can provide rehabilitation care for hemophiliacs (in an infrastructure whose range of specialties has led to national recognition), athletes who have suffered trauma (notably players from FC Nantes and Hermine de Nantes, FDJ-BigMat cycling team or the Crédit Agricole cycling team), musculoskeletal disorders (within the regional “Lombaction” network), osteoarticular infections, management of the consequences of falls among the elderly, management of multiple and polytraumatic injuries.

==== Pharmacy ====
The Saint-Jacques site houses the CHU de Nantes central pharmacy.

The central pharmacy is responsible for managing and distributing: medicines to the internal-use pharmacies of each site (Hôtel-Dieu, Hôpital Nord Laennec, and Hôpital Saint-Jacques); and consumable medical devices to the care units dependent on the CHU de Nantes. It also handles the sterilization of medical items.

In 2011, the department employed 37 people, 10 of whom were medical staff (six and six respectively for the internal-use pharmacy).

The central pharmacy is also home to OMEDIT Pays de la Loire, the regional health agency's support structure for drugs and medical devices.

==== Medical Information, Evaluation and Public Health Unit (Pimesp) ====
This service is aimed at healthcare personnel, in the fields of medical information, assessment of professional practices, risk management, therapeutic education, occupational health, and professional risks. It is also involved in public health research (epidemiology and biostatistics).

==== Psychiatry sector 1 ====
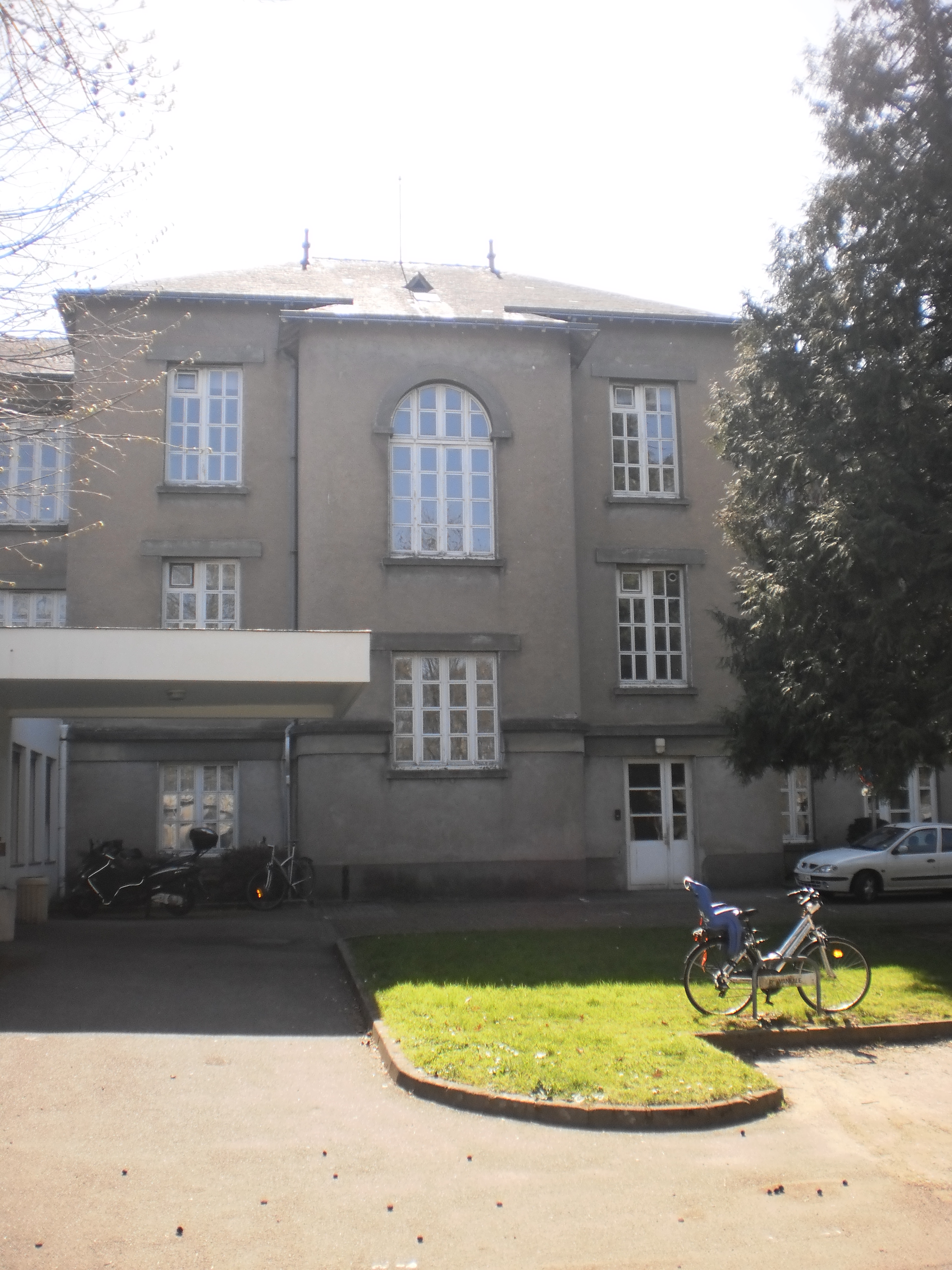
Psychiatric sector building 1.

Within the psychiatric cluster, sector 1 covers the communes of Couëron, Indre, and Saint-Herblain. In 2009, this sector cared for 2,617 patients (2,066 on a part-time basis), with an average hospital stay of 16 days. Full-time hospitalization takes place in the weekday hospital, with a capacity of 11 people, and two full-time hospitalization units, one open with a capacity of 23 people, the other closed and secure, with a capacity of 10 people, two of the rooms being set aside for intensive care. The Beaumanoir medical-psychological center (or CMP Ouest), located on rue Lamoricière, is also part of this cluster, in common with sectors 4 and 5.

==== Psychiatry sector 2 ====
Linked to sector 3, sector 2 covers the Nantes districts of Ile de Nantes and Nantes Sud, as well as the municipalities of Carquefou, Sainte-Luce-sur-Loire, Saint-Sébastien-sur-Loire, Basse-Goulaine, Haute-Goulaine, Saint-Julien-de-Concelles, and La Chapelle-Basse-Mer. Based in the Pierre-Janet pavilion, it is responsible for mental health care and prevention for residents in its geographical area.

==== Psychiatry sector 3 ====
Linked to sector 2, sector 3 covers the Nantes districts of Malakoff-Saint-Donatien, Saint-Joseph-de-Porterie, and Doulon-Bottière. Based in the Philippe-Pinel pavilion (access via Porte Pierre-Janet), it is responsible for mental health care and prevention for residents in its geographical area. On the Saint-Jacques site, it groups the Camille-Claudel and Gaston-Chaissac units. The sector also includes the La Pérouse medical-psychological Center (La Pérouse Square), the Marguerite day hospital (Général-Marguerite Street) and the La Halvèque part-time therapeutic reception Center (CATTP) (François-Hennebique Street).

==== Psychiatry sector 4 ====
Three units of psychiatric sector 4 are based at Saint-Jacques: the Matisse and Breton hospitalization units, and the structure d'accueil pour patients psychotiques institutionnellement dépendants (Sappid) - unité Ulysse. Sector 4 covers the Nantes-Nord, Breil-Barberie and Hauts-Pavés-Saint-Félix districts, as well as downtown Orvault. Based in the Philippe-Pinel pavilion, it is responsible for mental health care and prevention for residents in its geographical area.

The structure for institutionally dependent psychotic patients (Sappid) is common to all sectors, and has a research and training mission in the field of chronic psychoses.

Sector 4 includes the Pont-du-Cens day hospital (Robert-Schuman Boulevard), the Bout-des-Pavés part-time therapeutic reception center (CATTP), the Le Phénicien therapeutic hotel in Orvault, and, in common with sectors 1 and 5, the Beaumanoir medical-psychological center (or CMP Ouest), located on Lamoricière Street.

==== Psychiatrie secteur 5 ====
Three units of psychiatric sector 5 are based at Saint-Jacques: the Dali and Tati hospitalization units in the Henri-Ey building, and the “soins-prévention-adultes jeunes en crise” space. Sector 5 covers the Dervallières-Zola, Bellevue-Chantenay, and Centre-ville districts of Nantes. It is responsible for mental health care and prevention for residents in its geographical area.

The “care-prevention-adults-young people in crisis” unit offers 12 beds for full-time hospitalization and 3 for day hospitalization of adolescents, and coordinates actions linked to the care of young people aged 11 to 21 (link with the association “maison départementale des adolescents”, consultations, counseling).

Sector 5 includes the An Treiz day hospital (Saint-Aignan Boulevard) and the Phileas-Fogg part-time therapeutic reception center (CATTP) (Charles-Brunellière Street), and, jointly with sectors 1 and 4, the Beaumanoir medical-psychological center (or CMP Ouest), located Lamoricière Street.

=== Administrative services ===
==== Technical and logistics department ====
The Technical and Logistics Division, whose offices are located in the Saint-Jacques hospital, is divided into three departments: the Logistics and Hospitality Department (supplies, technical logistics, patient care); the Works and Techniques Department (works and construction, biomedical equipment, fire safety and security, maintenance, and cleanliness of premises); and the Purchasing Department. Staff are spread across the various sites of the Nantes University Hospital.

==== Aumônerie ====
Hôpital Saint-Jacques has a chaplaincy.

==== Documentation center ====
The East Hospital documentation center is located in the Élisa Mercœur building on the plateau des écoles. Access is reserved for students, CHU de Nantes staff, and healthcare professionals in general. It houses a collection of 5,000 books. The center is fully computerized, enabling research via the Internet. Services such as document search assistance, document monitoring, and the creation of dossiers based on articles from the newspaper Le Monde are also available.

==== Information Systems and Telecommunications Division (DSIT) ====
This department is responsible for telecommunications and the IT network and is based at Saint-Jacques. It manages the installation and maintenance of telephones, computers, printers, fax machines, biomedical equipment, and networks. It is also responsible for IT applications, as well as staff training related to its activities.

==== Guardianship ====
The hospital has a department dedicated to the management of guardianships set up for patients requiring protection.

==== Schools - training institutes ====
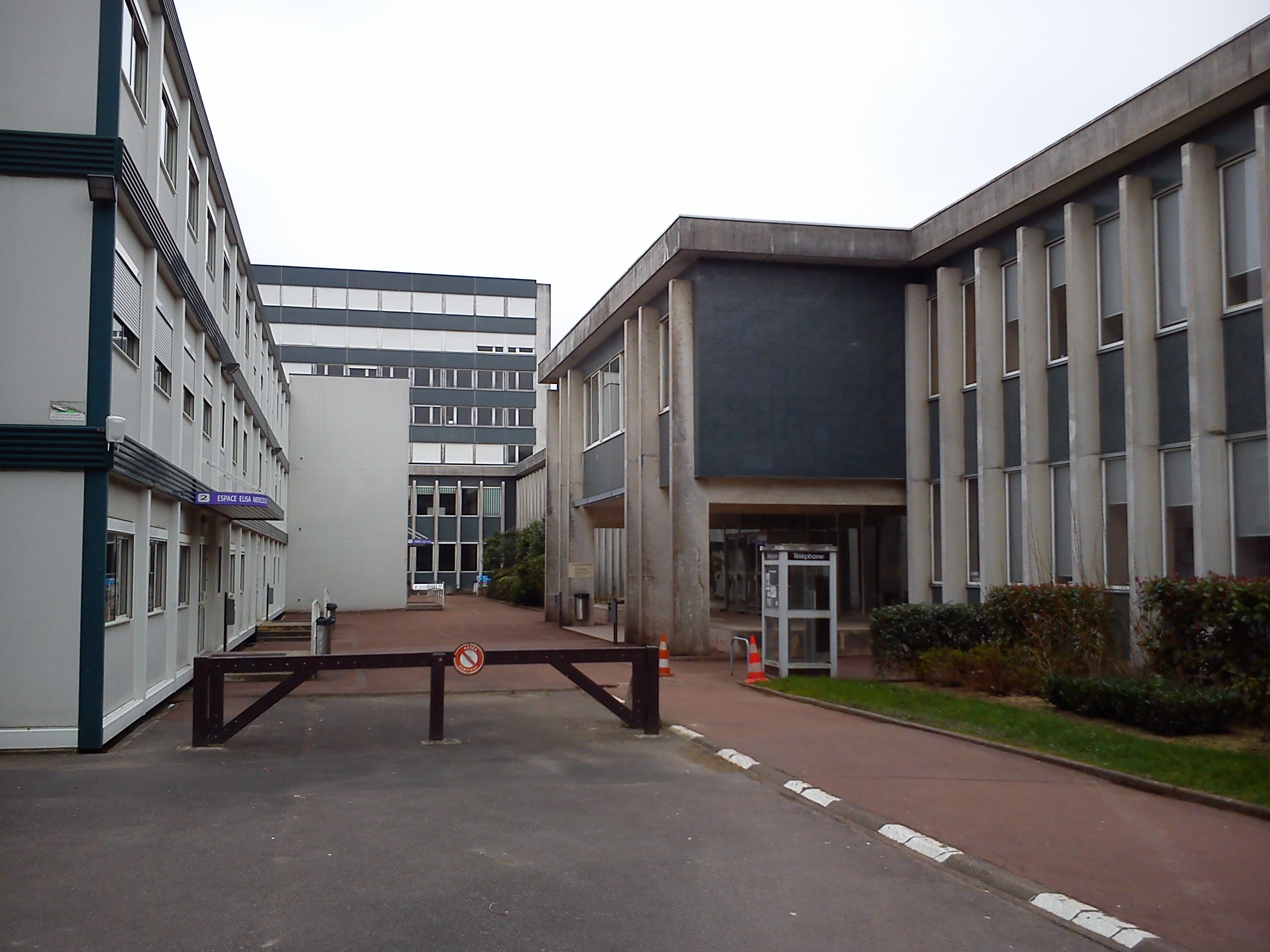
Main entrance to the Nantes University Hospital schools complex.

Alongside Hôtel-Dieu, Hôpital Saint-Jacques is one of the two sites housing the eleven schools and institutes of Nantes University Hospital's Department of Training Institutes (DIF), which welcomes an average of 1,200 students a year. Separated from the rest of Hôpital Saint-Jacques by the wide boulevard Émile-Gabory, in the middle of which runs the busway, the schools' plateau houses the documentation center, and the institutes for medical electroradiology manipulator training (IFMER) and nursing care training (IFSI) in the Espace Léonie-Chaptal, health executives (IFCS) in the Château (or Hôtel de la Grèneraie), specialized nurses (Ifis) in the Marie-Curie building and the Institut de Formation des Métiers d'Aide (IFMA) in the Espace Élisa-Mercœur, to train care assistants, nursery nurses and home helps.

==== Associations ====
The building is home to the Maison des Associations de l'Hôpital Saint-Jacques.

These include the Société d'Histoire de la Médecine et des Hôpitaux de l'Ouest, founded in 1988 by Professor Barrière. It aims to study the history of Nantes hospitals, and it promotes (in agreement with the Loire-Atlantique departmental archives) the conservation and communication of hospital archives in the Loire-Atlantique region, including the archives of the former civil hospices (notably the Hôtel-Dieu, Saint-Jacques and Bellier hospital collections).

Also housed at Saint-Jacques, the association Visite des malades dans les établissements hospitaliers organizes visits to isolated patients. On the same site is the Association recherche animation insertion handicap (Apraih), whose aim is to “promote the fullest possible integration of people with disabilities”.

== Saint-Jacques Hospital in the cultural arena ==
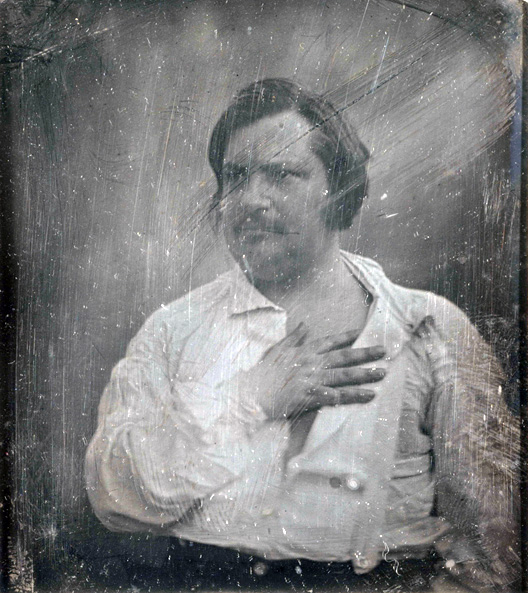
Honoré de Balzac in 1842.

Honoré de Balzac uses the Saint-Jacques old people's hospice as the setting for his novel Pierrette, written in 1839. The hospital did exist when the work was written, but not during the period in which the story takes place (1824–1829).

"Ever since her parents entered the kind of hospice where they were sadly ending their lives, Pierrette, young and proud, had suffered so horribly living there for charity, that she was happy to know she had rich parents. On hearing of her departure, Brigaut, the Major's son, her childhood friend, now a carpenter's boy in Nantes, came to offer her the sum needed to make the journey by car, sixty francs, the entire treasure trove of her painstakingly amassed apprentice's tips, accepted by Pierrette with the sublime indifference of true friendships, and which reveals that, in a similar case, she would have taken offense at a thank you. Every Sunday, Brigaut came to Saint-Jacques to play with Pierrette and console.

In Le Bachelier, written in 1881, Jules Vallès drew inspiration from his internment at Saint-Jacques thirty years earlier. In this autobiographical novel, he sets the action in Le Mans and lets another teacher's son experience the episode. In his book Jules Vallès, Max Gallo describes the harshness of internment at Saint-Jacques. Le petit teigneux de Saint-Jacques is a novel by Gaston Blandin recounting the time a child from the Pays de Retz spent at Saint-Jacques hospital in 1910.

The hospital is the setting for a scene in Emmanuel Courcol's film Cessez-le-feu, released in 2017.

== Personalities linked to Saint-Jacques hospital ==
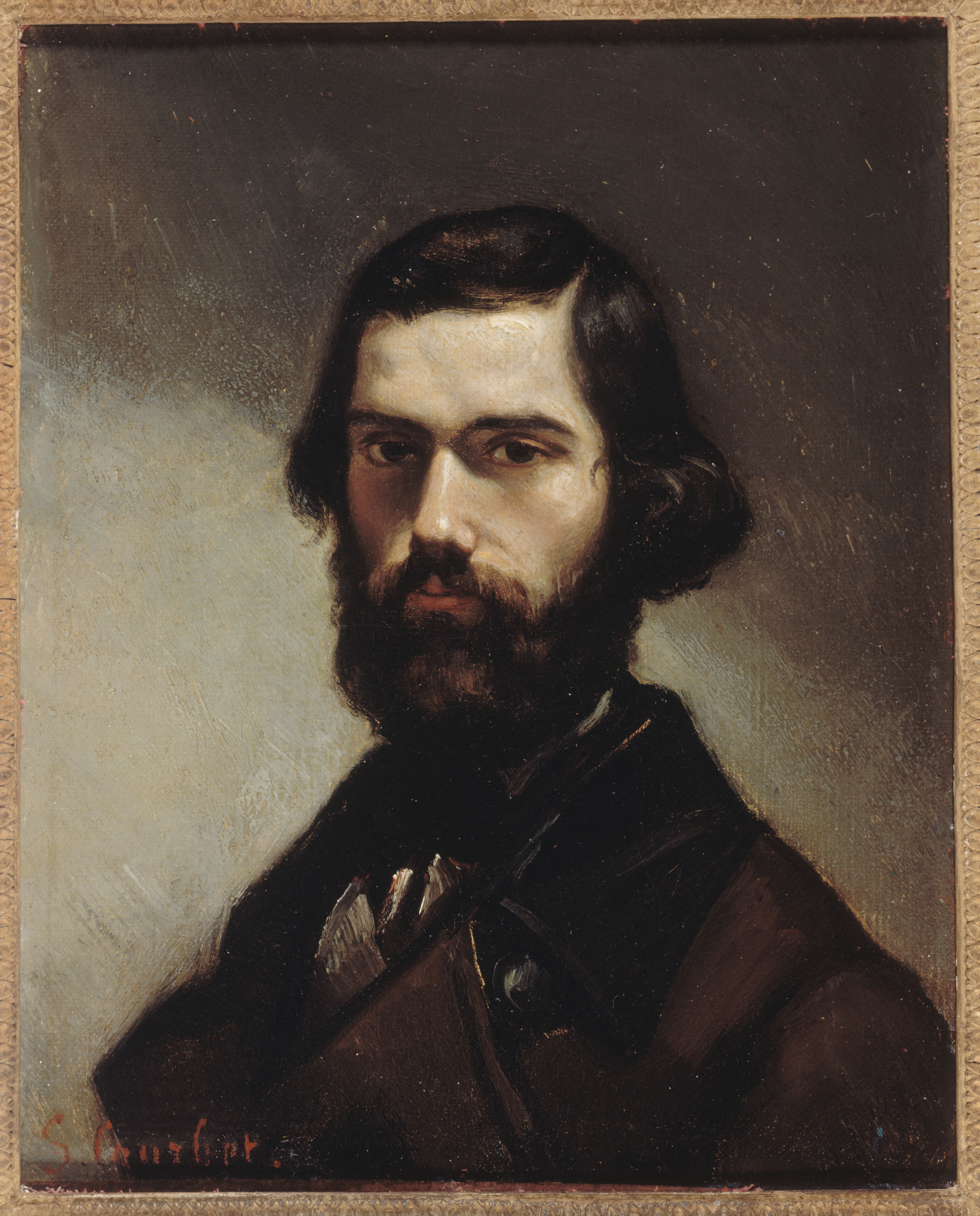
Portrait of Jules Vallès circa 1861, painted by Gustave Courbet.

- Henri-Théodore Driollet (1805–1863), architect and designer of the Sainte-Croix church belfry and the fountain on Place Royale in Nantes, temporarily oversaw the hospital's renovation after 1834.
- M. Dulac (died August 23, 1869), master of coastal navigation and last survivor of the La Méduse raft, spent his last days at Saint-Jacques as a paying resident of the old people's hospice.
- Jules Vallès (1832–1885), French teacher (notably at the Lycée Georges Clemenceau) and writer, interned in the insane ward between December 31, 1851, and March 2, 1852.
- Georges Clemenceau (1841–1929), a French physician politician, and young doctor interned in the insane ward between March and October 1861.
- Jacques Serf, Barbara's father, died on December 20, 1959, while admitted to the Hôpital Saint-Jacques for treatment of a cerebrospinal tumor. The singer arrived too late to see her father alive; this episode inspired the song Nantes.
- Louis Corman (1901–1995), French psychiatrist, inventor of morphopsychology, founder of the child psychiatry department at Hôpital Saint-Jacques.

== See also ==
- Nantes
- Psychiatric hospital

== Bibliography ==
- Aussel, Michel (1977). Bouchet de Nantes (Camille Bouchet : 1801-1854). Paris: Université Paris V Pierre et Marie Curie.
- Aussel, Michel (2002). Nantes sous la monarchie de Juillet : 1830-1848: du mouvement mutualiste aux doctrines politiques. Nantes: Ouest éditions. ISBN 2-908261-78-2.
- Flohic, Jean-Luc (1999). Le Patrimoine des communes de la Loire-Atlantique, Charenton-le-pont. Flohic éditions. ISBN 2-84234-040-X.
- Sigot, Jacques (1999). Nantes, l'hôpital Saint-Jacques, Montreuil-Bellay coll. «Mémoire d'une ville». éditions CMD. ISBN 978-2-909826-98-1.
- Lallié, Alfred (1883). Les prisons de Nantes pendant la Révolution. Imprimerie Vincent Forest et Émile Grimaud.
- Savariau, Maurice (1986). Souvenir d'anciens, évolution de la psychiatrie à Saint-Jacques - Entretien avec le docteur Corman. CHU Nantes.
- Sauvage, Jean-Pierre (1995). Un propriétaire à Pont-Pierre, Louis de Tollenare trésorier des hôpitaux, Histoire et mémoires. Saint-Herblain.
- Tusques, Jacqueline and Jean; Chouteau, Marcel (1989). «Nantes, l'hôpital Saint-Jacques», Annales de Nantes et du Pays nantais, Nantes, Société académique de Nantes et de la Loire-Atlantique.
- Uzureau, Joseph (1985). Reconstruction de l'Hôtel-Dieu », Annales de Nantes et du Pays nantais, Nantes, Société académique de Nantes et de la Loire-Atlantique.
- Maître, Léon (1981). Histoire administrative des anciens hôpitaux de Nantes. Marseille: Laffite.
- Bouchet, Camille (1840). Annales d'hygiène publique et de médecine légale, « Les aliénés du département de la Loire-Inférieure ».
- Contrôleur général des lieux de privation de liberté, Rapport de visite: centre hospitalier universitaire Saint-Jacques de Nantes. Loire-Atlantique: CGLPL. 2012.
