= Basilica of St. Nicolas, Nantes =

Catholic basilica in Nantes

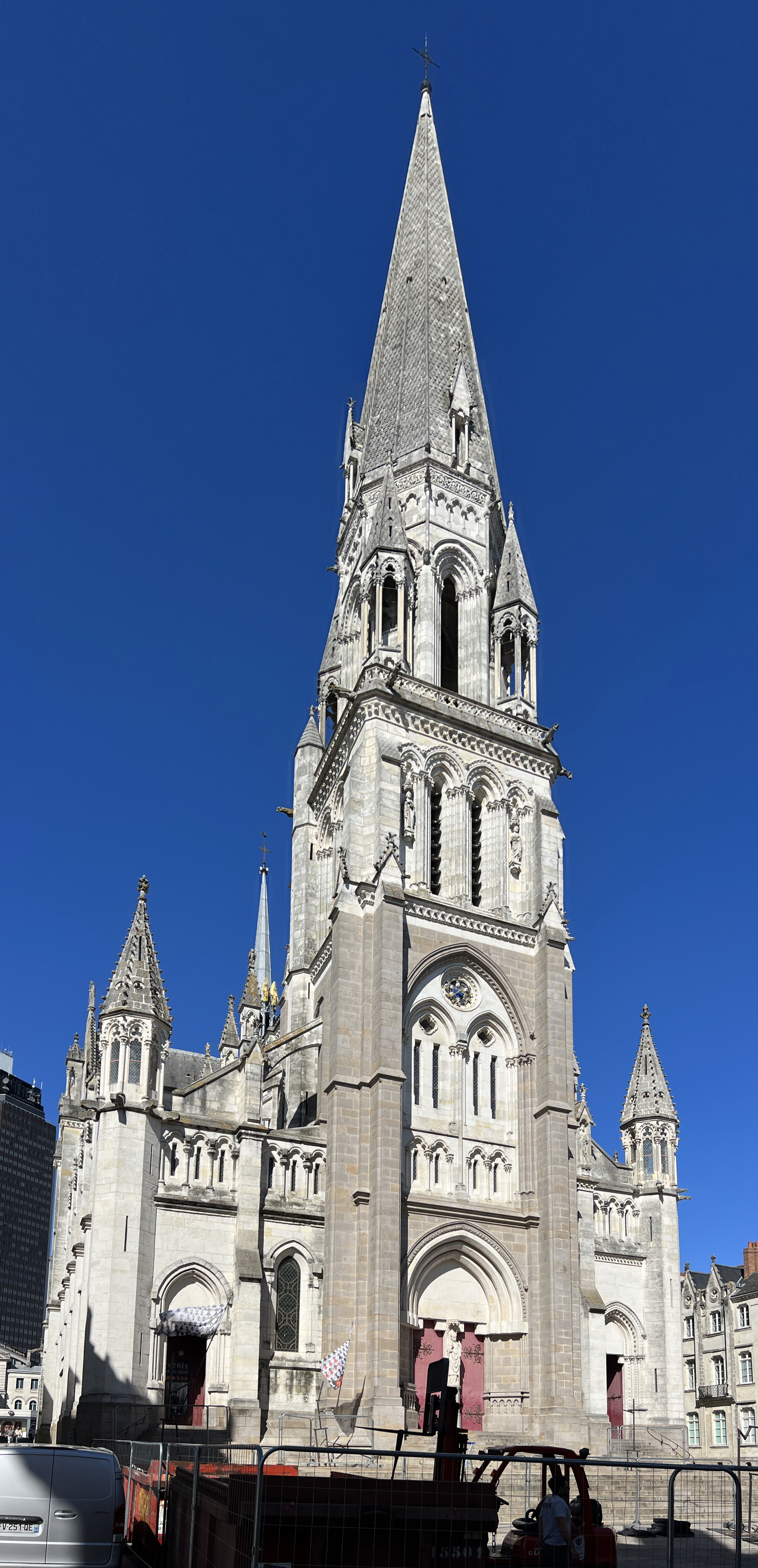
- Western facade of the Saint-Nicolas basilica in Nantes.

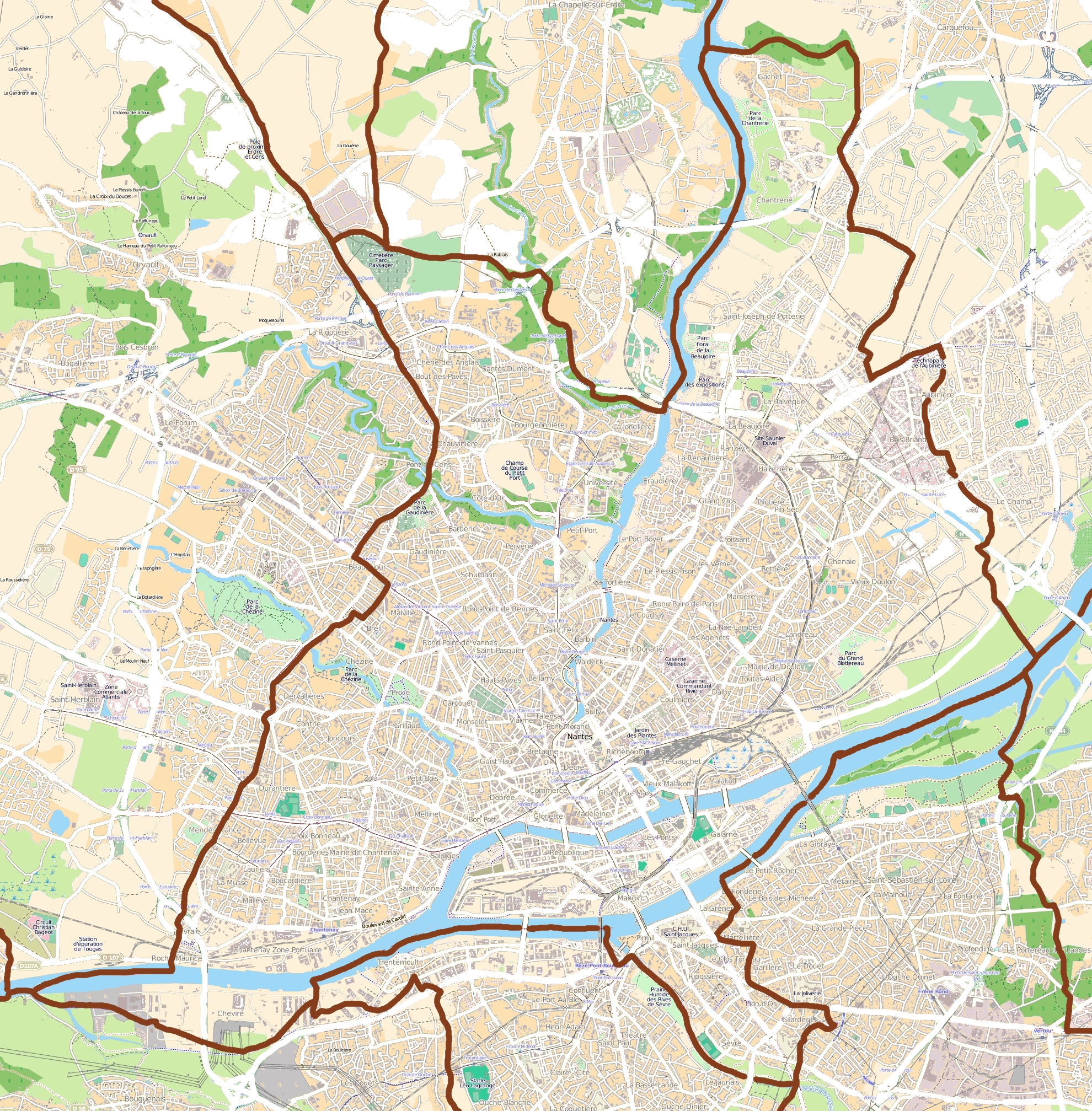
- Location within Nantes

Religion
- Affiliation: Catholic Church
- Prefecture: Nantes
- Province: Loire-Atlantique
- Region: Pays de la Loire
- Patron: Saint Nicholas

Location
- Country: France
- Interactive map of Basilica of St. Nicolas, Nantes
- Prefecture: Nantes
- Coordinates: 47°12′56″N 1°33′28″W

Architecture
- Architect: Jean-Baptiste Lassus
- Style: Neo-Gothic
- Completed: 1869
- Inscriptions: MH (1985)

The Basilica of St. Nicolas in Nantes is a Catholic basilica constructed in the neo-Gothic architectural style, situated in the heart of Nantes. It is one of two basilicas in the city, the other being the Basilica of Saint Donatien and Saint Rogatien.

== Historical overview ==
=== The first church ===
A chapel or small subsidiary church was constructed between the second half of the 11th century and the end of the 12th century. In the 18th century, the priest, theologian, and historian Nicolas Travers postulated the existence of a construction before 1186, citing the mention of a "St. Nicolas cemetery" in that year. At that time, the area was part of the Similien of Nantes parish. In 1226, Peter I of Brittany initiated the construction of an enclosure that encompassed the St. Nicolas neighborhood.

=== 15th century extension ===
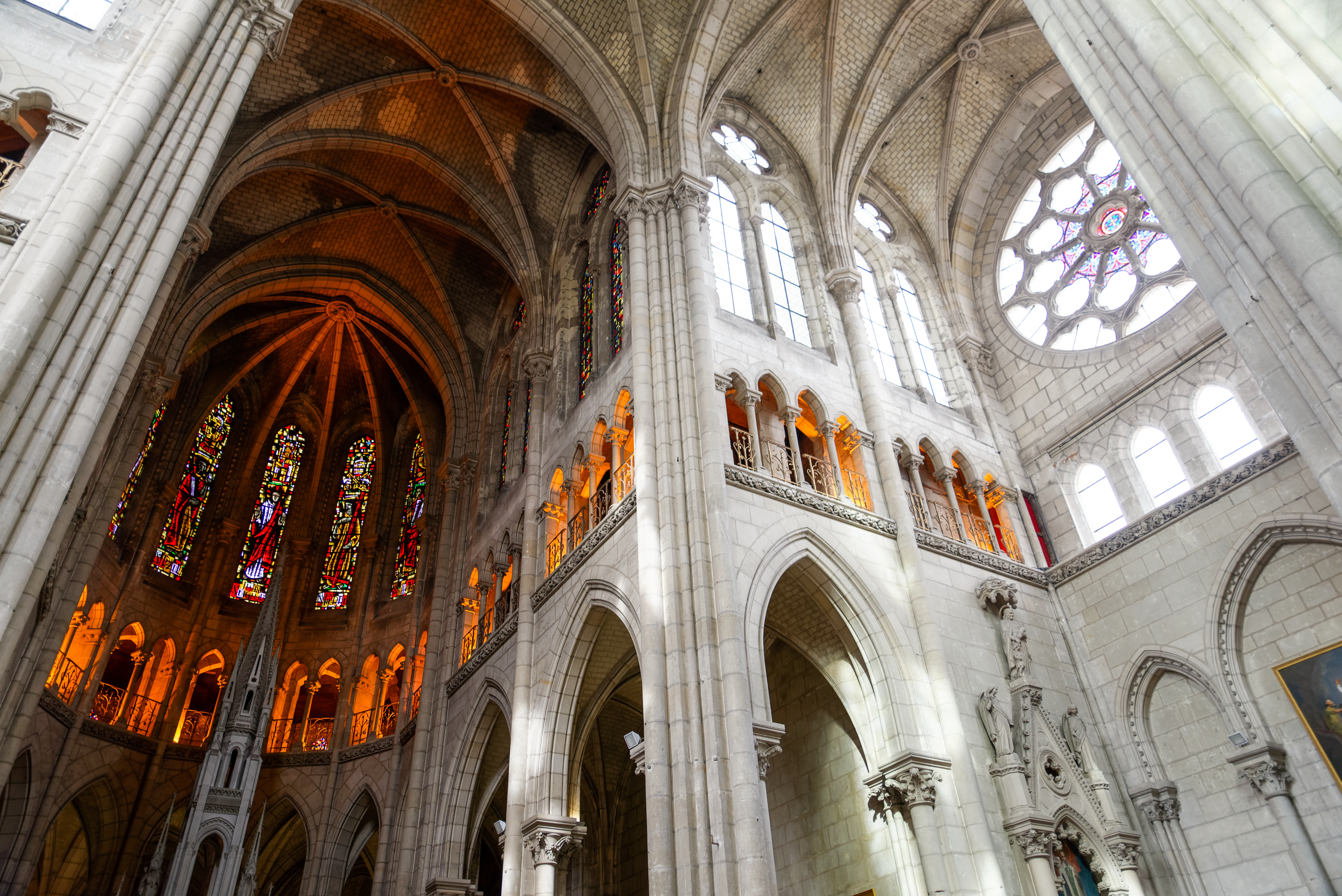
Choir and transept of St. Nicolas basilica.

In the early 15th century, the fortifications had deteriorated to such an extent that Duke Francis I was prompted to undertake a program of renovation and reconstruction. This included the rebuilding of the St. Nicolas gate, situated at the junction of present-day Arche-Sèche and Commandant-Boulay streets. During this period, the St. Nicolas church also underwent renovations. Its name was first mentioned in a document dated 1444, which certified the work on the building's portal by Mathurin Rodier. Rodier was also responsible for the reconstruction of the nearby St. Nicolas gate. The church was situated at the heart of a parish bearing its name.

From 1450 onward, the Church underwent a series of expansions that coincided with a notable increase in the parish's population. The Fabric Council resolved to procure some properties, including a residence owned by Michel Botinat, a property belonging to the religious community of the Saint-Marie de Pornic convent, and another property owned by Jehan Rouxeau, a knight serving the Duke of Brittany. Consequently, plots of land were purchased to create a separation between the structure and the curtain wall. The nave of the church was then constructed on a portion of the ancient wall erected by Peter I, which still exists today in the form of remnants visible on Duvoisin Street, situated along the western side of the current church. The successive extensions were such that they justified a new inauguration, conducted by Bishop Pierre of Chaffault on 24 February 1478. Two notable features of the building were a 20-meter-high stained glass window and an altar adorned with 26 statues.

=== 17th and 18th centuries ===
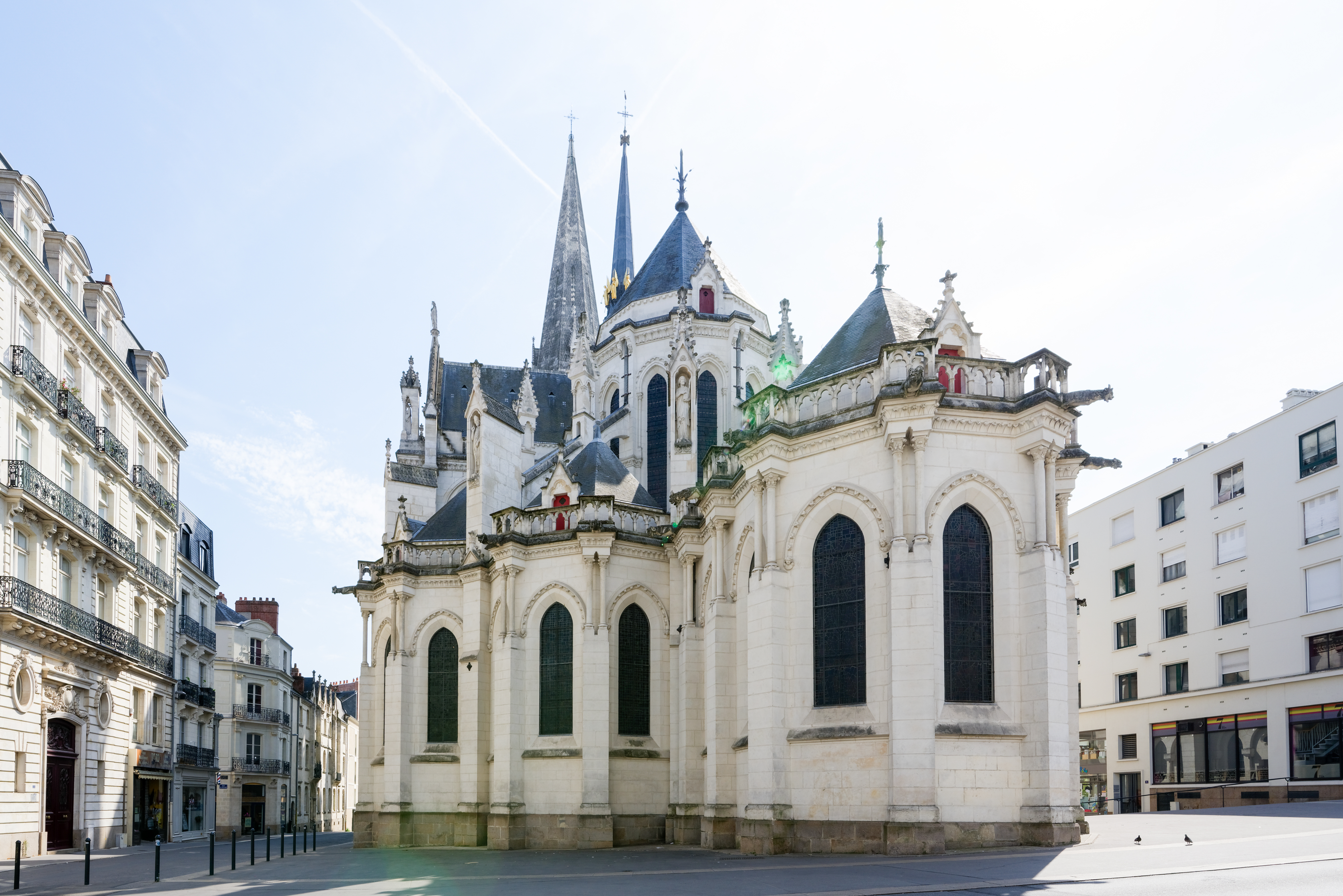
The chevet of St. Nicolas basilica.

In the mid-17th century, the bell tower was in a state of disrepair and was at risk of collapsing. A fundraising campaign was initiated, which included the sale of valuable liturgical books. The restoration work commenced in 1766 and was concluded in 1772. However, the parish had a more ambitious vision, namely the complete reconstruction of the building. The initial plans were drafted as early as 1773, and the decision to proceed with the reconstruction was made in 1789. The renovation that spanned from 1766 to 1772 thus marked the final modification to the existing structure, which featured three naves separated by a substantial pillar. The chevet was flat, with the apse situated at the current Affre Street, accessible from the south via Place Félix-Fournier. The main entrance was from the south, via a porch located at the current Félix-Fournier square. The church retained its monumental stained glass window and ornate altar.

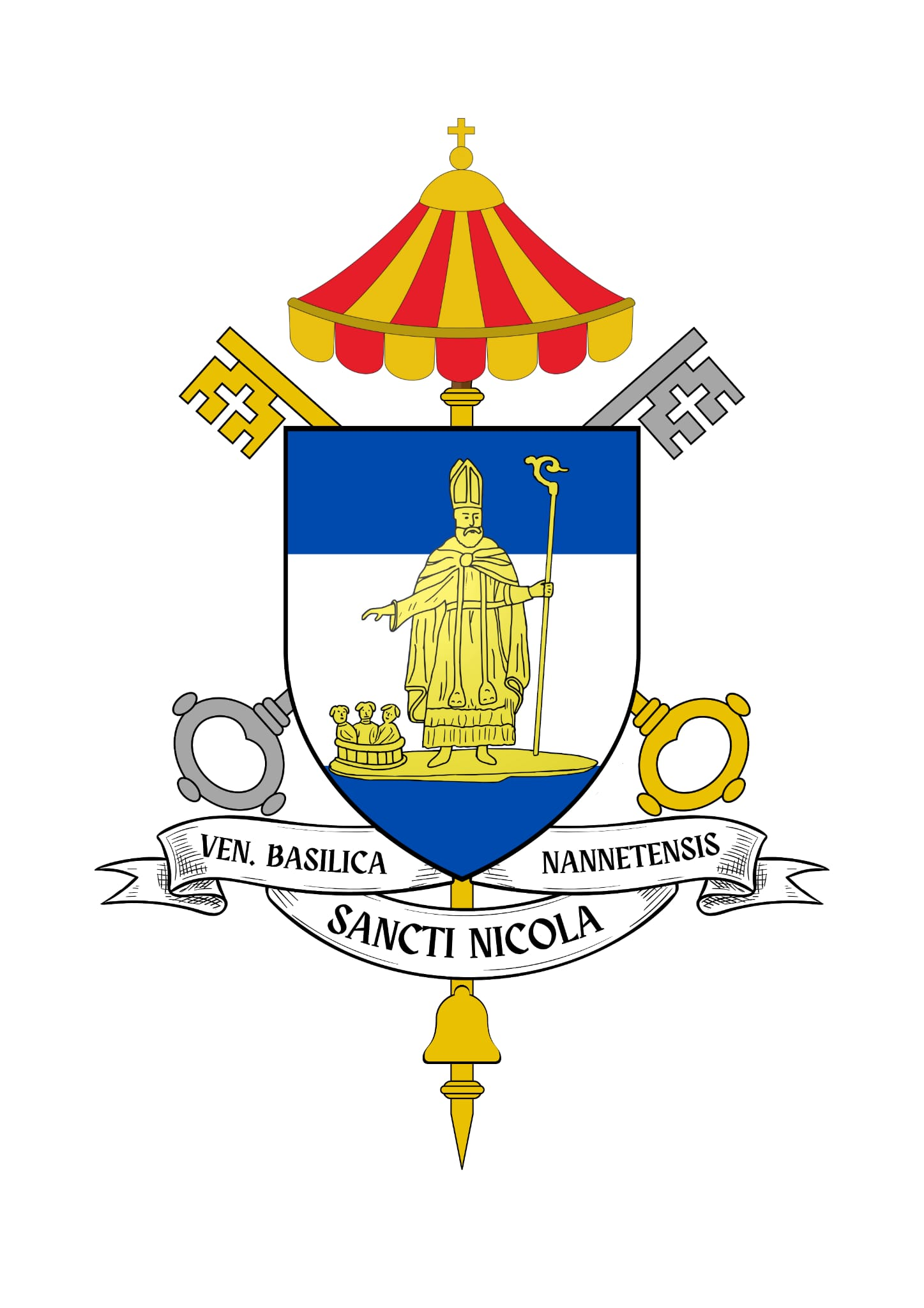
Digital coat of arms for the Basilica of St. Nicolas in Nantes.

=== The new building ===
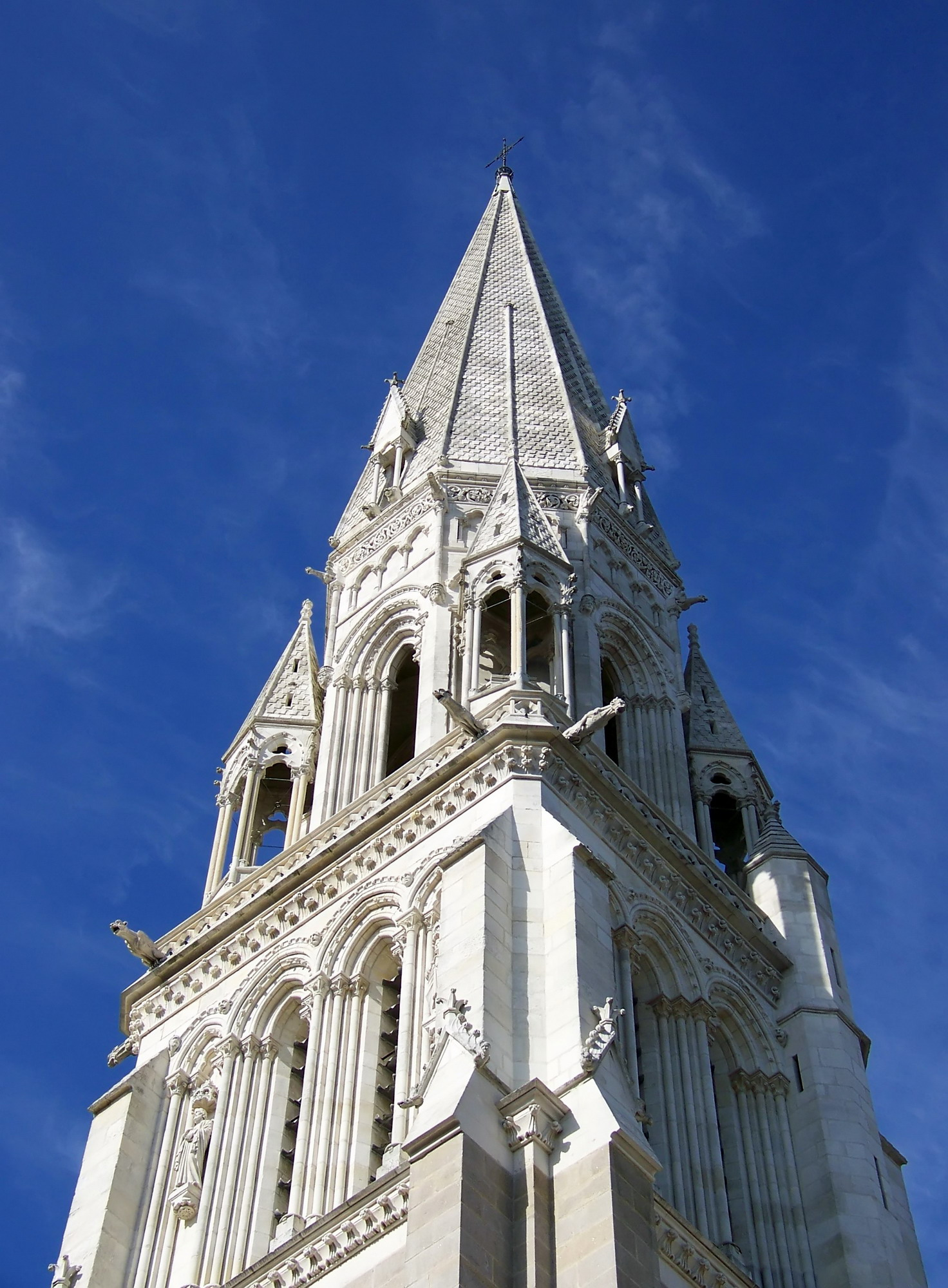
The bell tower of St. Nicolas basilica.

Under the impetus of Félix Fournier, parish priest and future bishop of Nantes, the construction of the current church spanned from 1844 (laying of the foundation stone) to 1869 (blessing of the building) on a narrow plot that required it to be oriented on a north-south axis, rather than the traditional east-west Christian orientation (sun rising on the sanctuary). The construction of the bell tower alone occupied the last fifteen years of the work. A commemorative medal celebrated the laying of the foundation stone of the new church, during the reign of Louis-Philippe, under the administration of Prefect Achille Chaper and Mayor Ferdinand Favre. The church was built with regional granite, as well as hard stones and tuffeau from Touraine. The project was entrusted to Jean-Baptiste-Antoine Lassus, a student of Henri Labrouste and collaborator of Eugène Viollet-le-Duc, who, along with Piel, made it one of the very first neo-Gothic projects in France. (Note: The Royal Chapel of Dreux, the first known neo-Gothic edifice, was nearing completion after almost three decades of construction, as was the Basilica of Notre-Dame de Bonsecours near Rouen.) It was raised to the status of a minor basilica on 26 October 1882, by Pope Leo XIII.

The tomb of Félix Fournier, who died in 1877, was installed in 1883.

The neo-Gothic furniture was listed as a historical monument on 20 November 1985, a year before the church itself was classified on 6 November 1986.

=== Damage and reconstruction ===
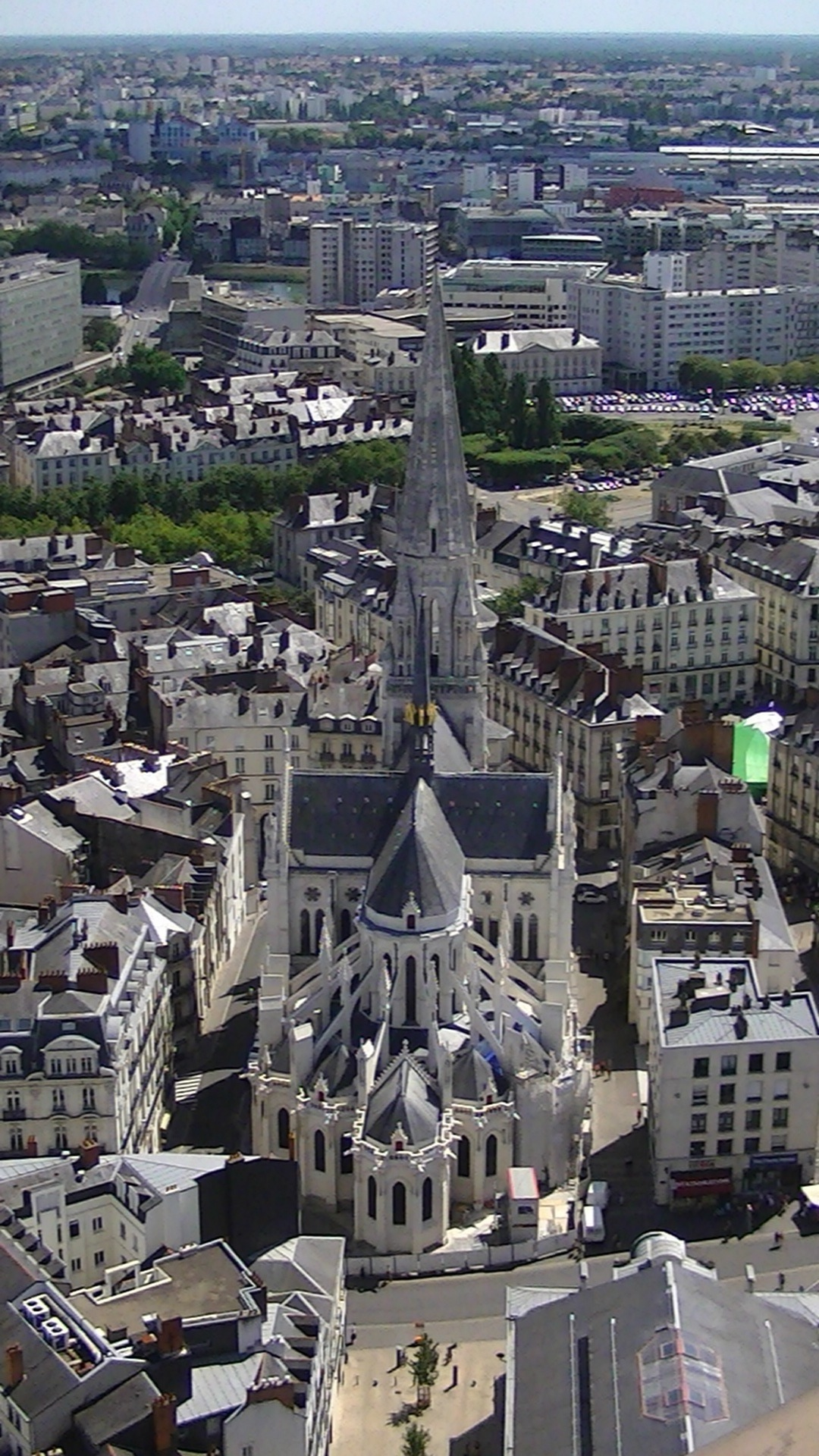
St. Nicolas basilica seen from the Tour Bretagne.

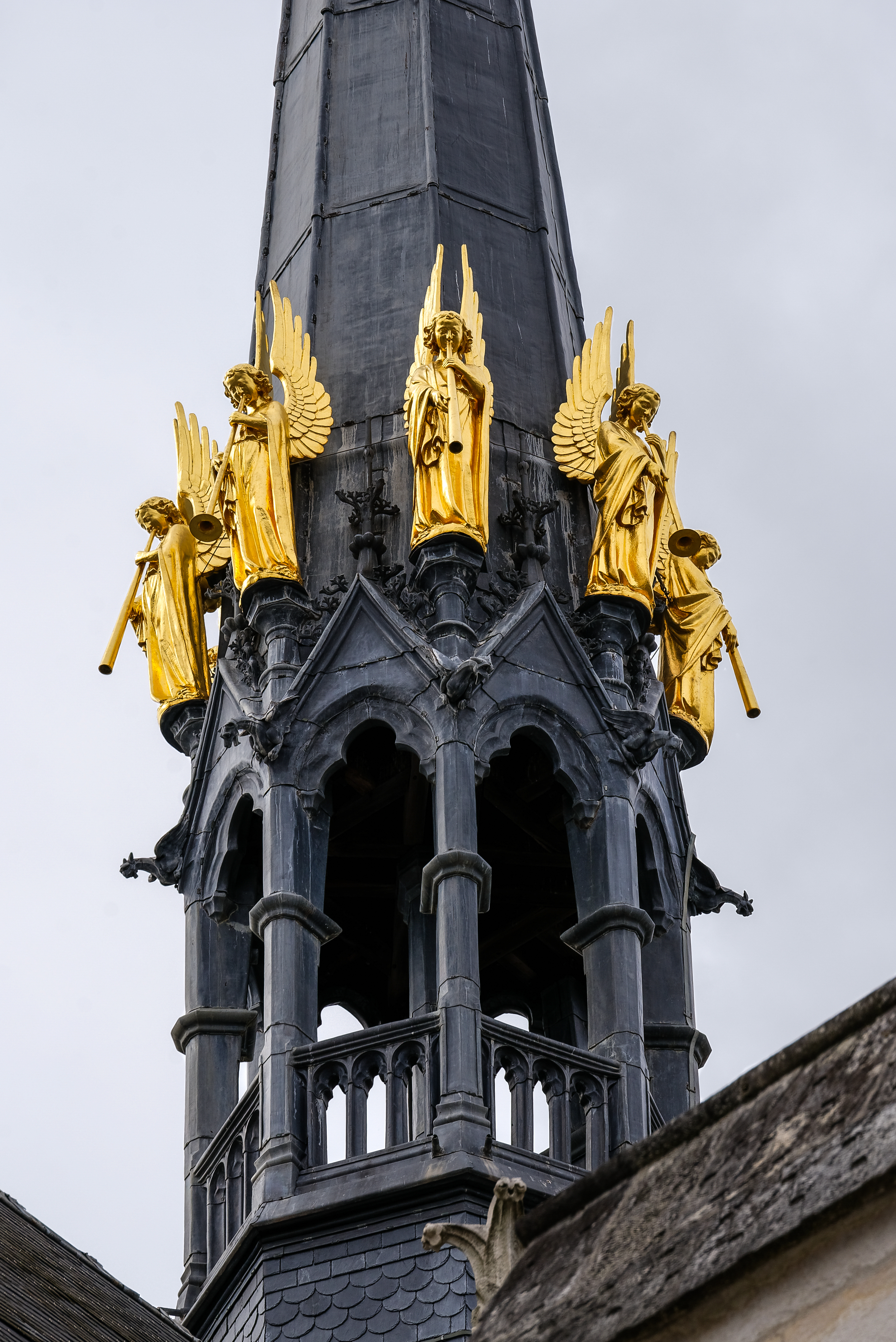
The angels on the spire of the Basilica of St. Nicholas.

The church sustained significant damage as a result of the Allied bombing campaign on 16 September 1943. This had a considerable impact on the surrounding area, including parts of the Place Royale and the Rue du Calvaire, which runs along the northern side of the latter. Paul Caillaud, director of Nantes' passive defense, indicated that the church sustained significant damage along its ambulatory route on Rue Affre, close to the bell tower, which was fortunately spared. Two vault ribs were dislodged. It appears that an anti-aircraft shell or a small bomb fell perpendicularly or exploded on the ground. Subsequently, other bombs entered obliquely and caused the arches and enclosure walls to open, partially dislodged the organ's woodwork, and caused the floor to collapse. The tomb of Bishop Fournier, a substantial marble base, was damaged. Following the conclusion of hostilities, the reconstruction project commenced in 1953 and continued until 1974. The damaged organ, constructed in 1901, was dismantled but subsequently rebuilt in two phases: in 1963 and 1985.

The exterior stone was significantly degraded by air pollution during the 20th century, necessitating a comprehensive restoration project initiated in 2004 under the direction of Pascal Prunet, chief architect of Historical Monuments. The project entailed the restoration of the tuffeau and granite, as well as the complete refurbishment of severely damaged exterior elements.

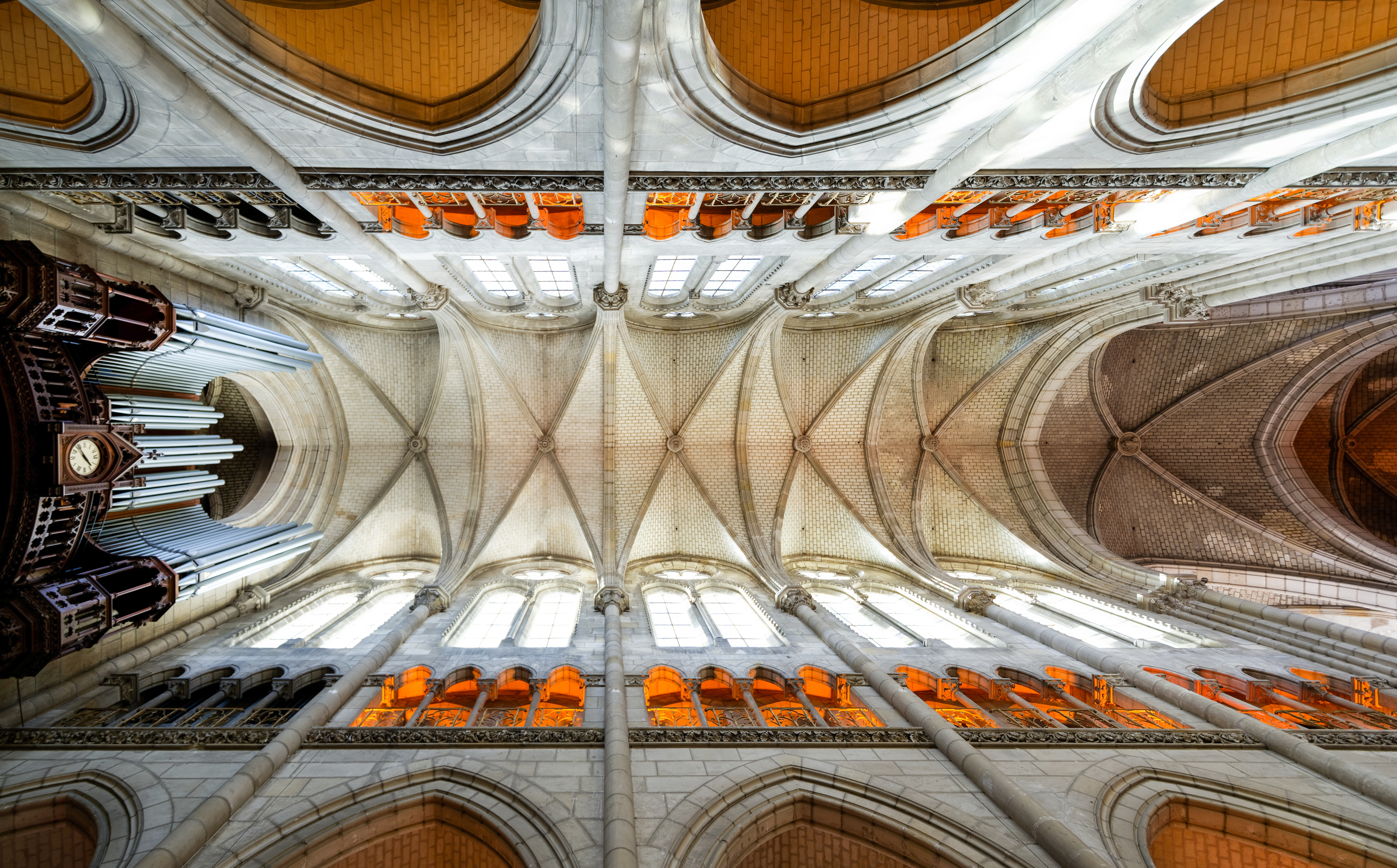
Nave of St. Nicolas basilica.

== Bells ==
The bell tower contains a set of five swinging bells, cast in 1882 by Adhémar Astier, a bell founder in Nantes.

- The voice of God in its strength (bourdon): E2 – 7,270 kg
- Anne-Joséphine-Aimée: A2 – 2,896 kg
- Louise-Anne-Cécile: B – 2,031 kg
- Joséphine-Elisabeth-Louise: C#3 – 1,451 kg
- Céleste: E3 – 876 kg

The bourdon is among the ten bells in France with the deepest sound. Its note (E2) is lower than that of the bourdon of Notre-Dame de Paris.

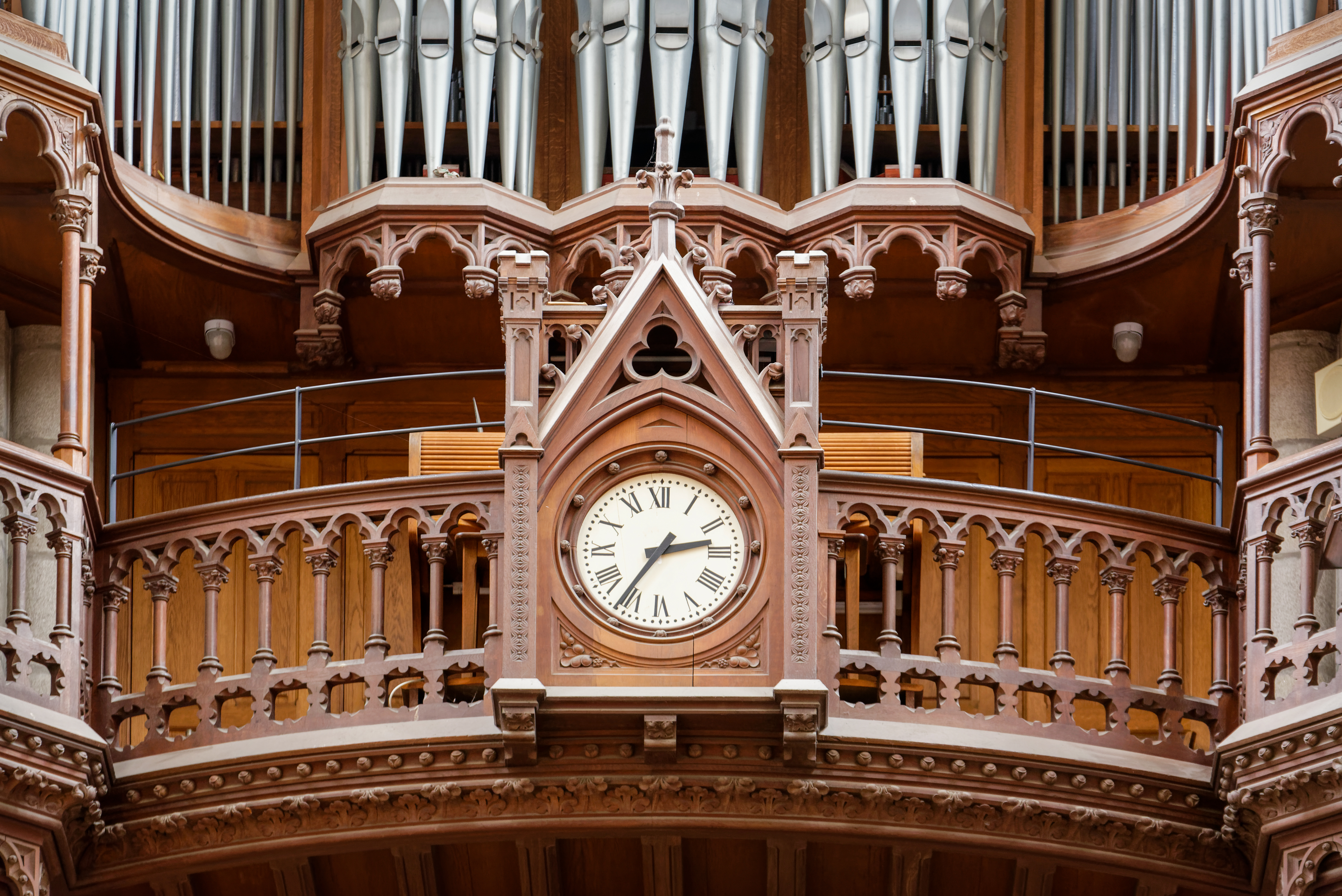
Detail of the great organ with clock.

== Gallery ==
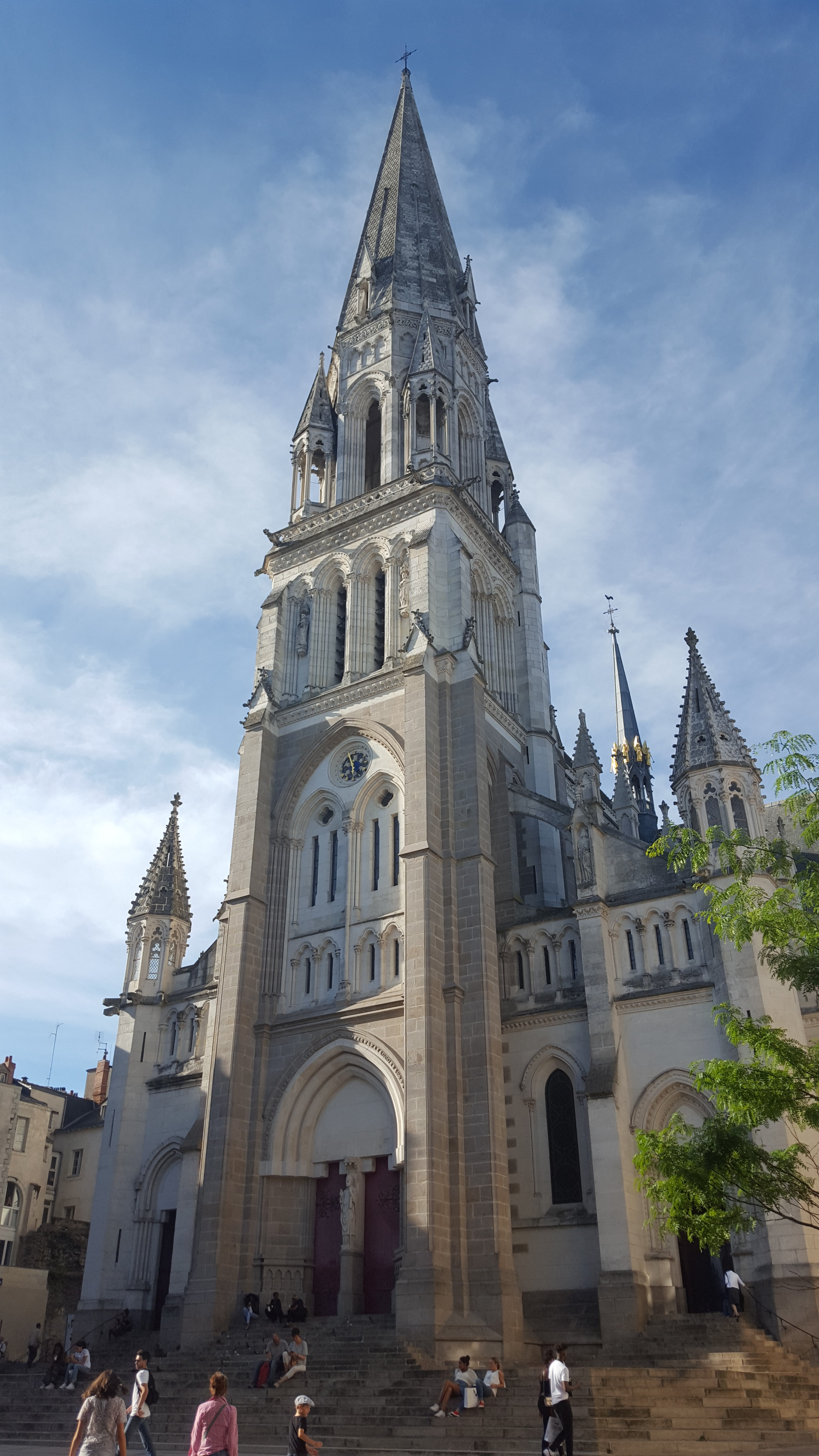
The bell.

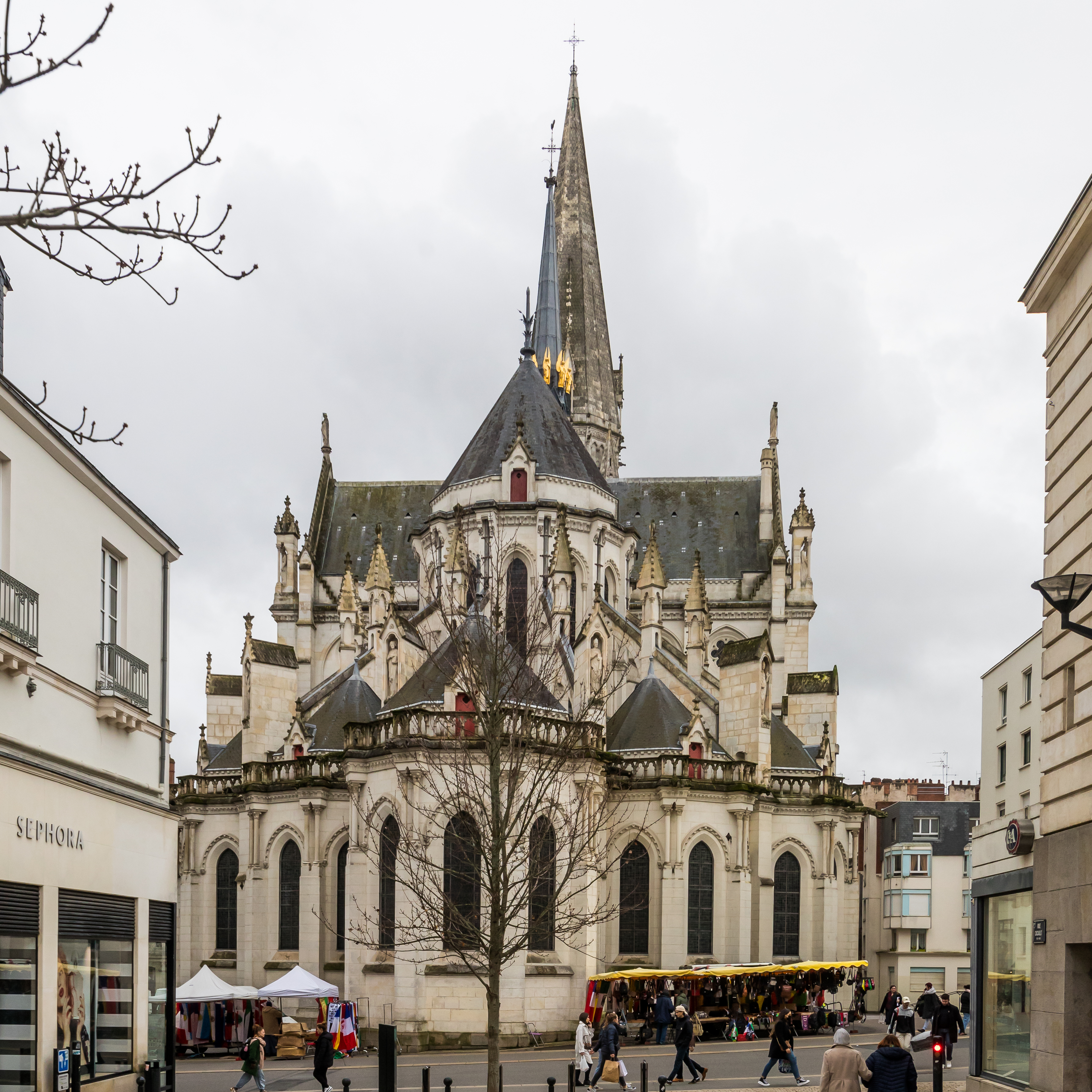
The chevet, spire and bell tower.

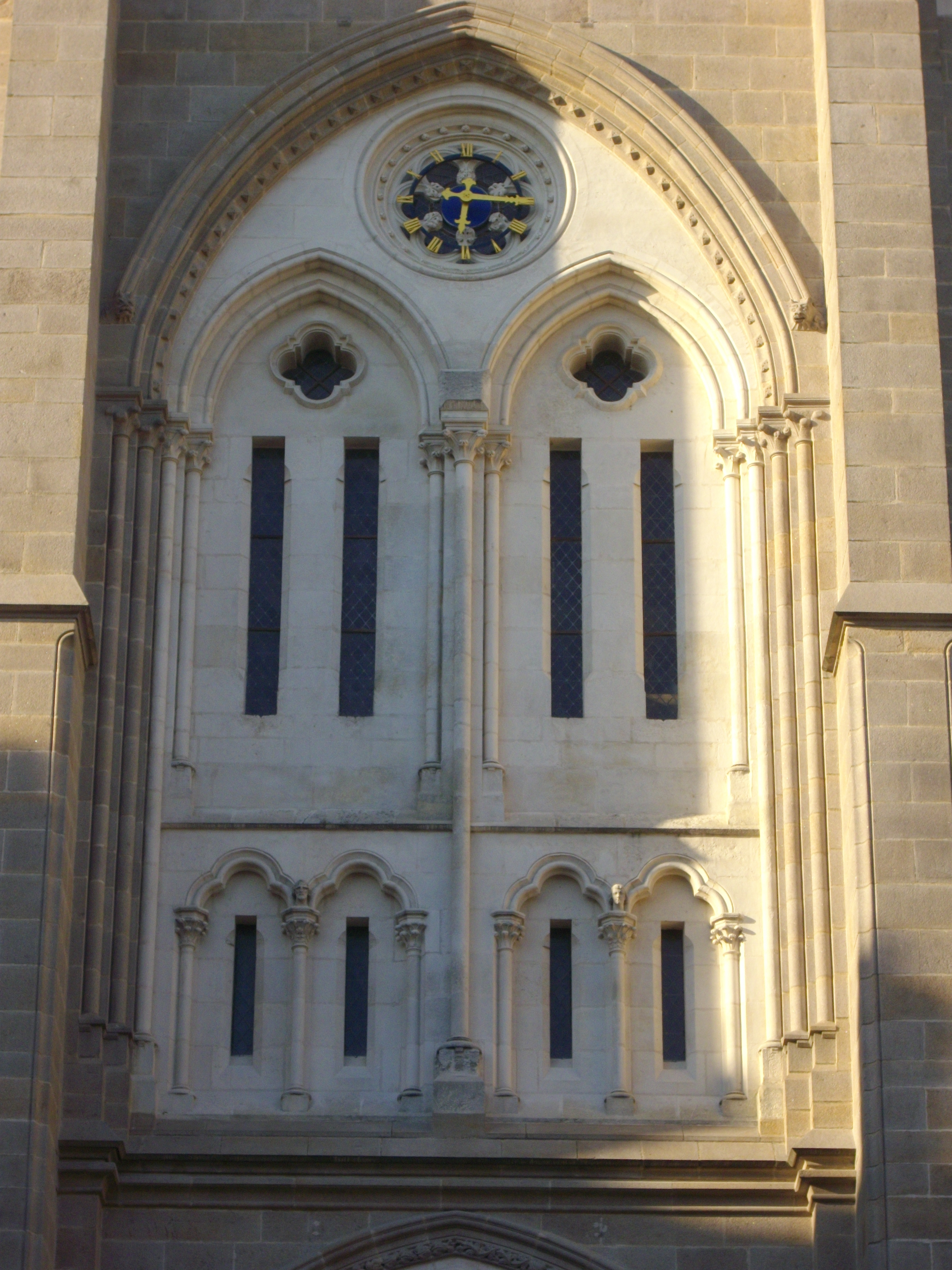
Clock on the western facade.

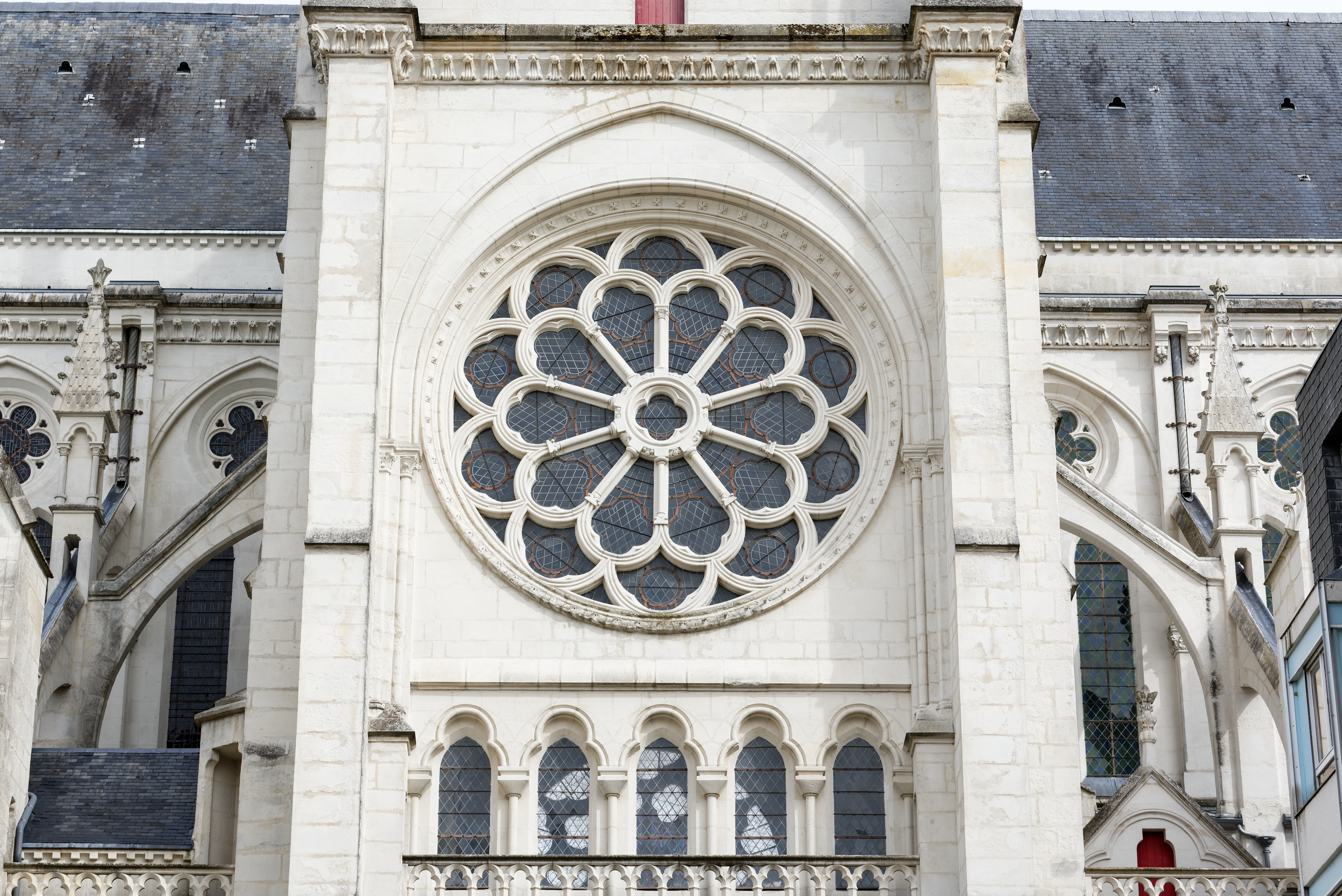
Transept rose window.

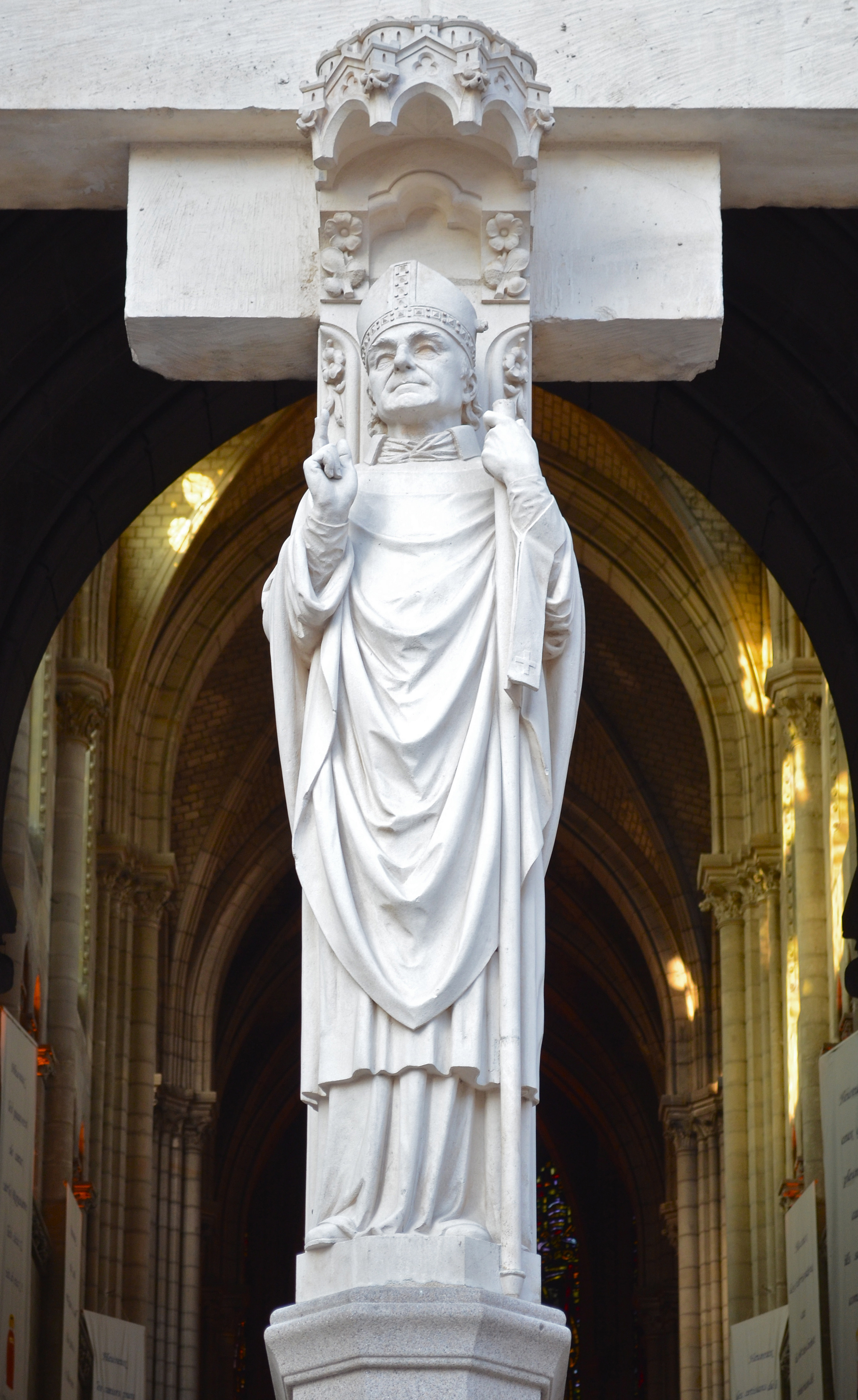
Gate statue.

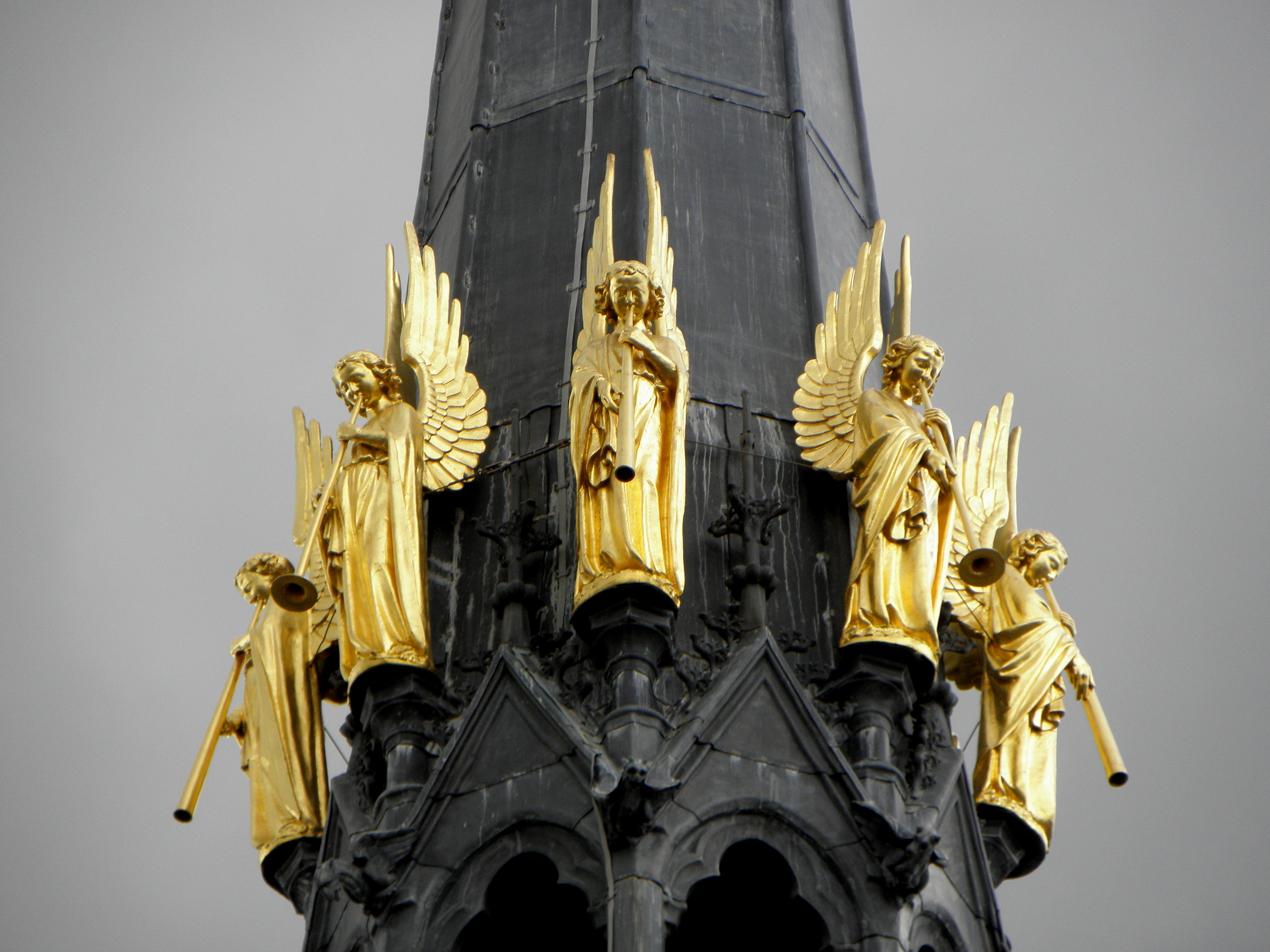
Eight-angel arrow.

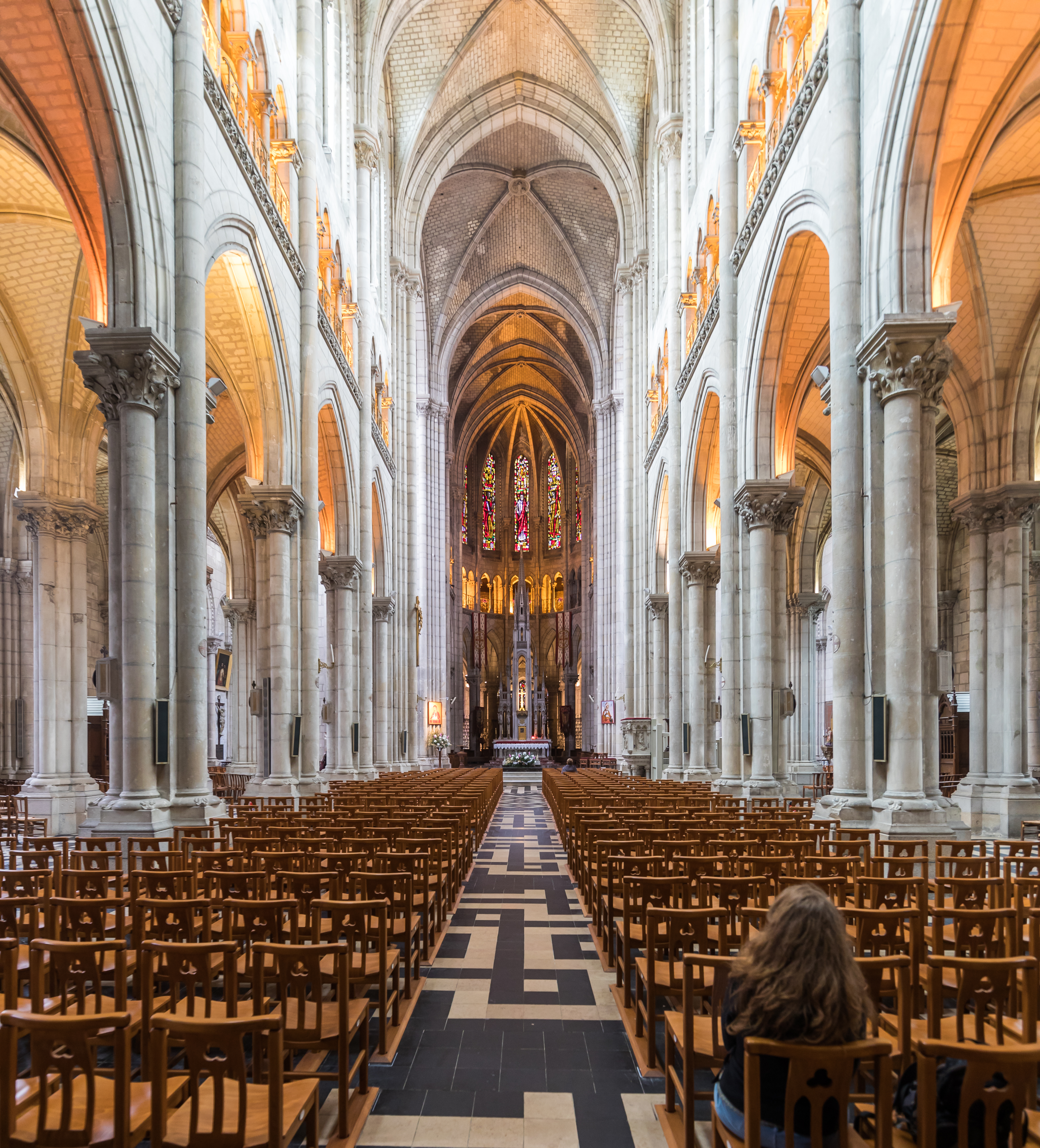
The nave.

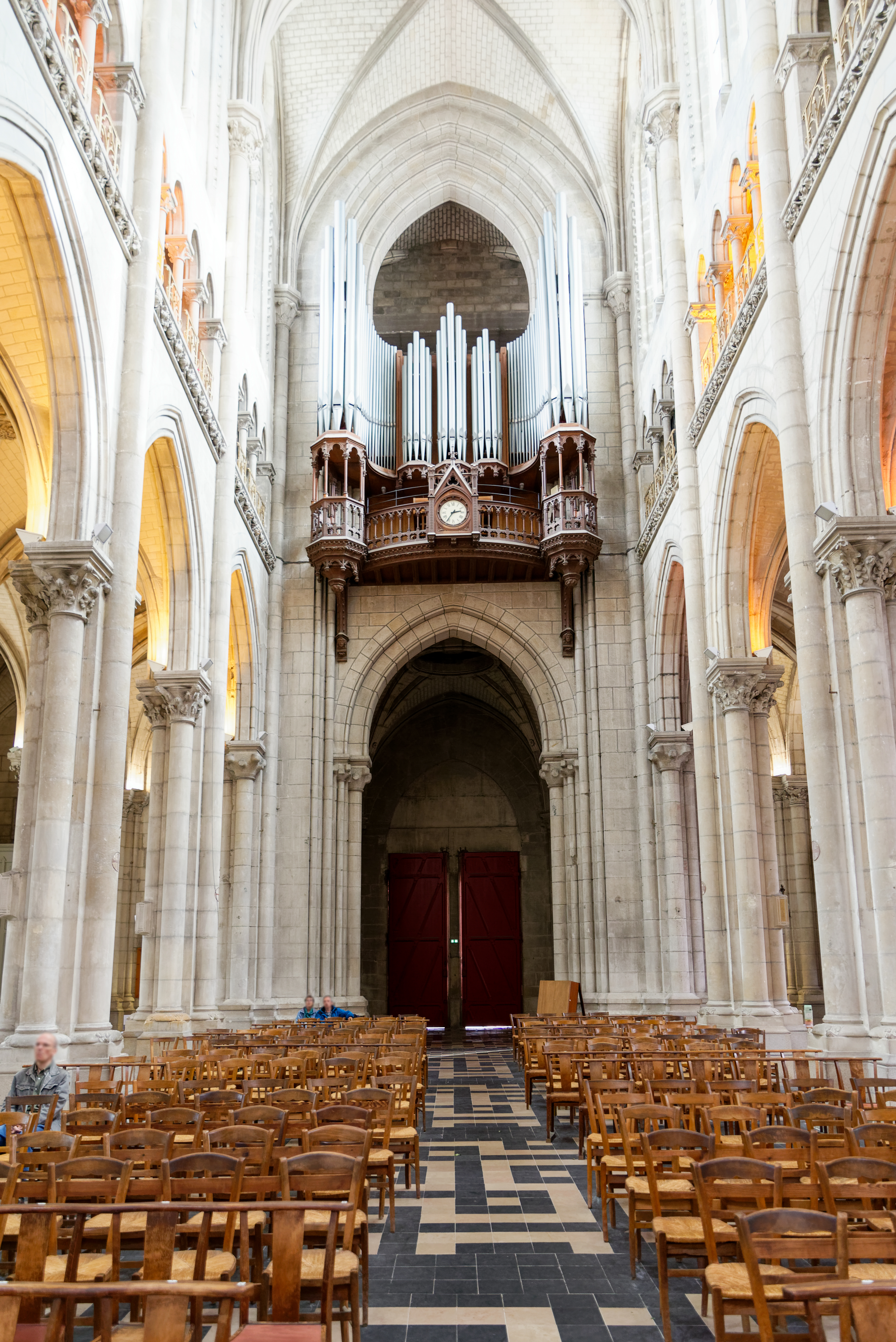
Great organ.

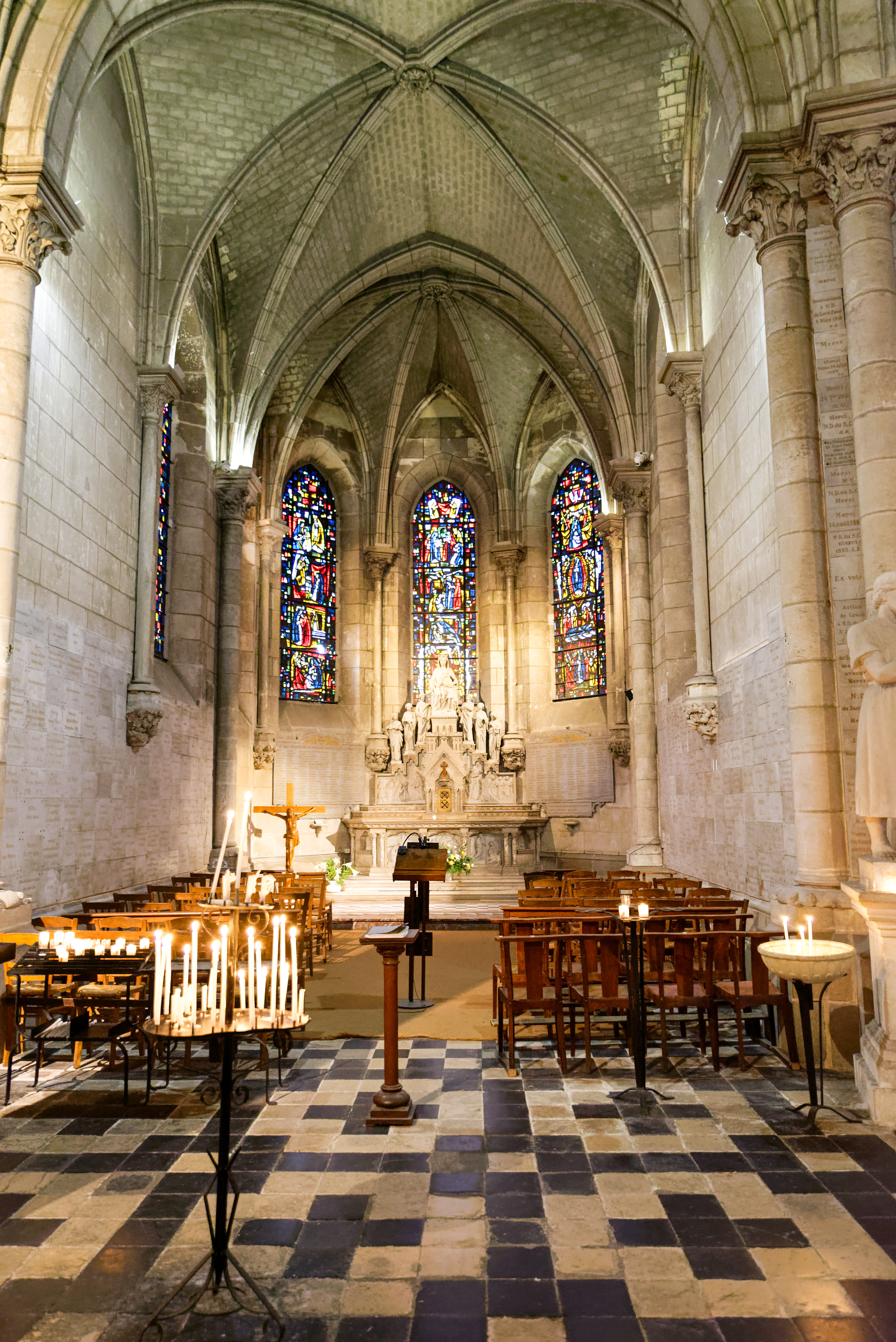
Virgin Chapel.

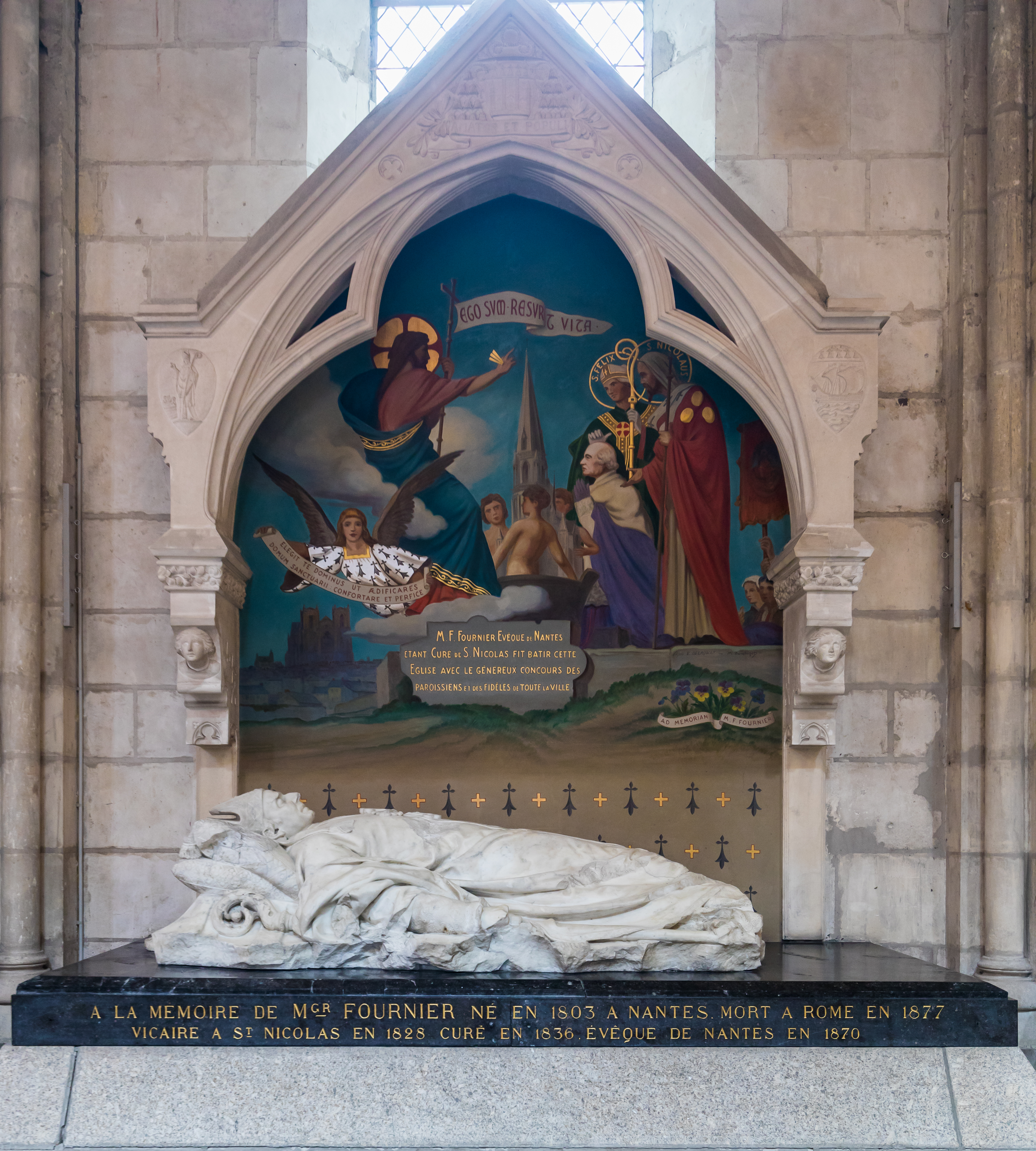
Monument dedicated to Mgr Félix Fournier, Bishop of Nantes from 1870 to 1877.

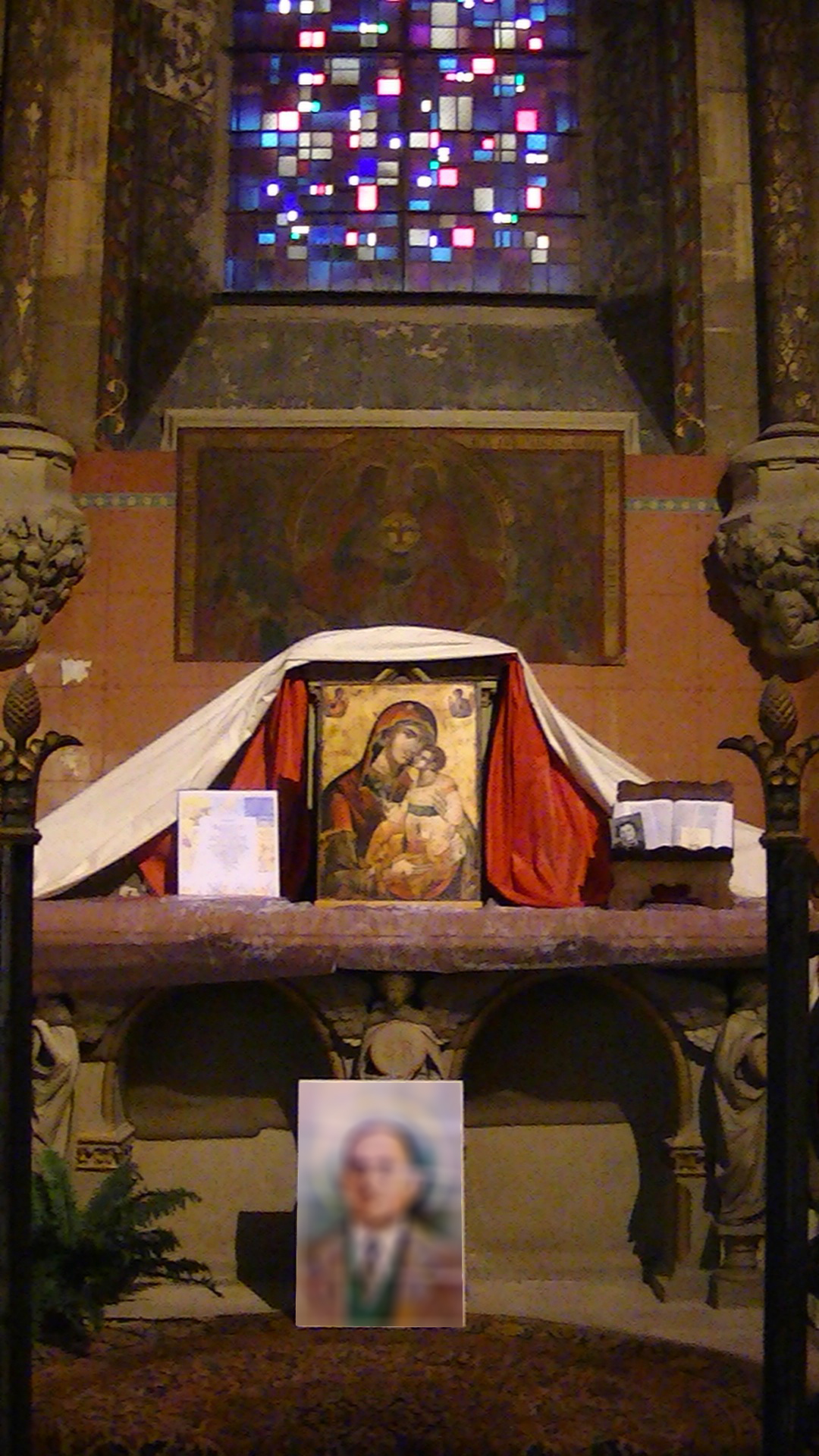
Chapel dedicated to Blessed Ceferino, martyr and first beatified gypsy.

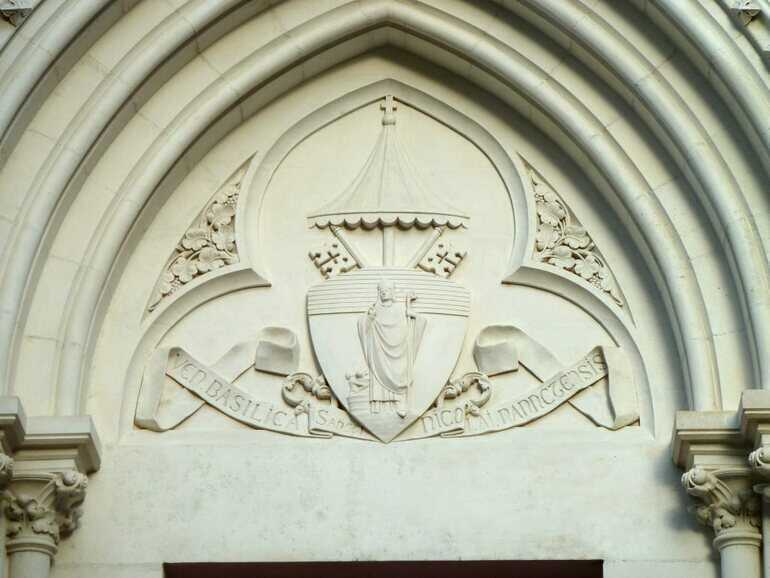
Coat of arms on the south door of the St. Nicolas basilica in Nante.

== Priests ==
- Brelet de La Rivellerie – 1731–1781
- Jean-Baptiste Lefeuvre – 1781–1813
- André-Mathieu Thebaud – 1813–1818
- René Chevriau – 1818–1823
- François du Paty – 1823–1836
- Félix Fournier – 1836–1870
- Charles Guillet – 1870–1874
- Alexandre Roy – 1874–1891
- Alfred-Pierre Creton – 1891–1900
- François Jarnoux – 1900–1918
- Joseph Robert – 1919–1946
- Charles Hamel – 1946–1956
- Henri Dubreil – 1956–1973
- André Gouin – 1973–1979
- Pierre Hervy – 1979–1989
- Jean Corbineau – 1989–2000
- Loïc Cacot – 2000–2002
- Pierrick Feidel 2004–2008
- Patrice Eon – 2008–2013
- Sébastien de Groulard – 2013–2019
- Loïc Le Huen – 2019

== See also ==
- List of basilicas in France
- Church of St Clement, Nantes

== Bibliography ==
- Bienvenu, Gilles; Croix, Alain; Launay, Marcel (2013). "Saint-Nicolas". Dictionnaire de Nantes (in French). Rennes: Presses universitaires de Rennes. pp. 902–904. ISBN 978-2-7535-2821-5.
- Foucart, Bruno; Noël-Bouton, Véronique (1973). "Saint-Nicolas de Nantes : bataille et triomphe du néo-gothique". Congrès archéologique de France : 126e session, 1968, Haute-Bretagne (in French). Paris: Société française d'archéologie. pp. 137–181.
- Ganuchaud, Georges (1989). Un geste de foi au milieu de la Cité : la basilique. Saint-Nicolas de Nantes et Lassus son architecte (in French). Treillières: Pierre Gauthier.
- Ganuchaud, Georges (1993). "La basilique Saint-Nicolas : le rêve du père Félix Fournier". Les Annales de Nantes et du pays nantais (in French) (246). Nantes: Société académique de Nantes et de la Loire-Atlantique: 12–14. ISSN 0991-7179.
- Jarnoux, Alphonse (1981). Les anciennes paroisses de Nantes : première partie; les paroisses de la cité (in French). Nantes: Alphonse Jarnoux.
- Legouais, Francis (1974). "Les édifices religieux de la paroisse Saint-Nicolas à travers les âges". Les Annales de Nantes et du pays nantais (in French) (171–172). Nantes: Société académique de Nantes et de la Loire-Atlantique: 5–12. ISSN 0991-7179.
