= Place Félix-Fournier =

Public square in Nantes, France

Coordinates: 41°23′56″N 4°18′46″E

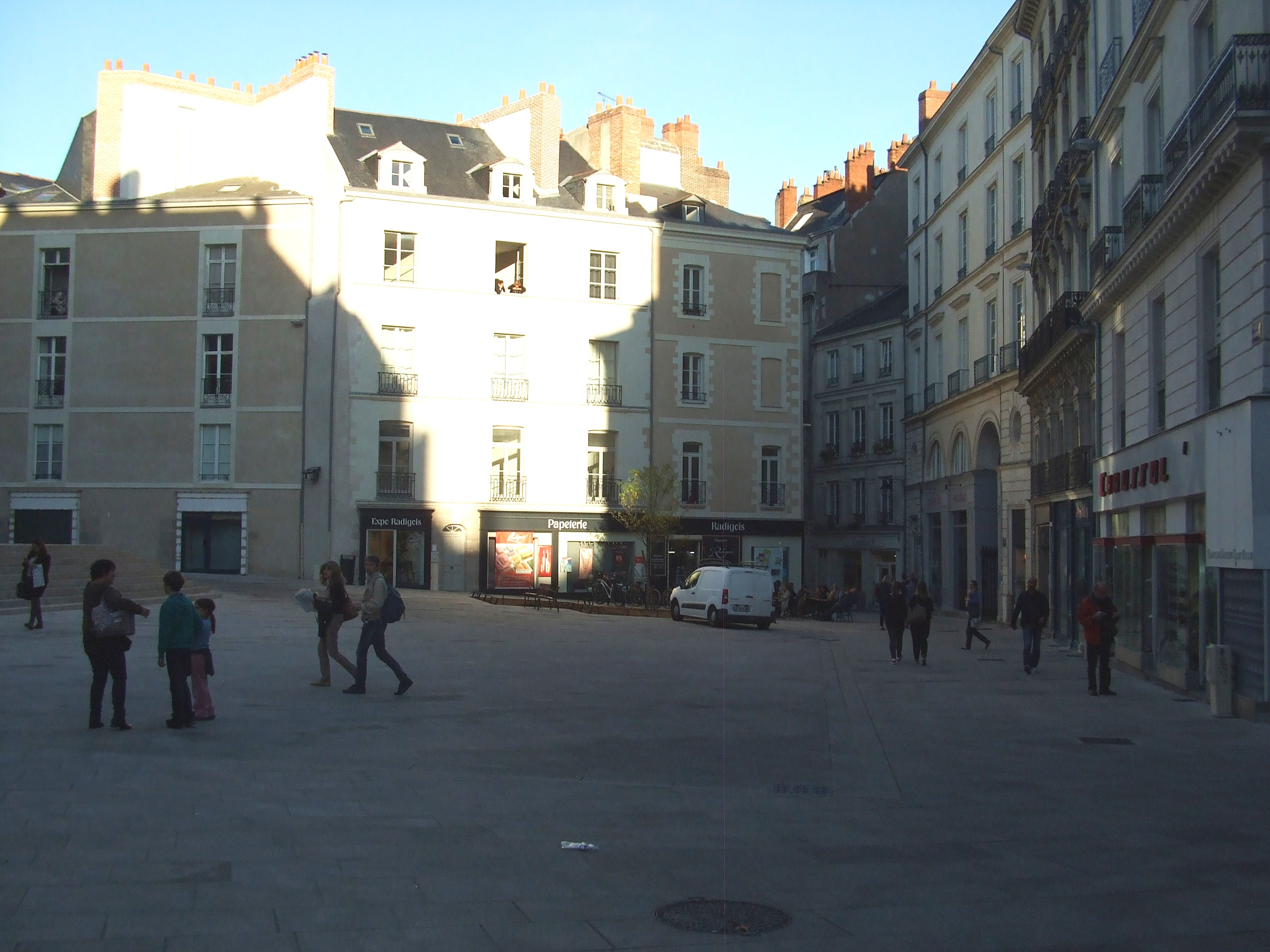
- The square seen from the Rue Commandant-Boulay
- Interactive map of Place Félix-Fournier
- Former name: Place Saint-Nicolas
- Type: square
- Location: Nantes

The Place Félix-Fournier is a public square in Nantes, France.

== Location and access ==
Located in the Nantes city center, near the Royal Square of Nantes, and in front of the parvis of the Basilica of St. Nicolas, it connects to the following streets: Rue Affre (to the northeast), Rue Saint-Nicolas (to the southeast), Rue Du Couëdic (to the southwest), Rue du Commandant-Boulay (to the southwest), Rue Duvoisin (to the northwest), as well as the Passage d'Orléans (to the south).

== Origin of the name ==
It is named after the bishop of Nantes Félix Fournier (1803–1877), also a legitimist deputy in the Constituent Assembly of 1848, who served as the parish priest of Saint-Nicolas overlooking this square, and whose tomb-monument is displayed in the basilica.

== History ==
Since the Middle Ages and the construction of the Basilica of St. Nicolas, the place was known as the "Place Saint-Nicolas", and at the end of the 19th century, it was renamed the "Place Félix Fournier Place".

Édouard Pied notes that, until the 1830s, the center of the square was occupied by a block of houses bordered to the south by the Rue Saint-Nicolas (which was then much longer than it is today), as well as by two other steep streets accessed by stairs: the "Petite Échelle Saint-Nicolas" to the west, and the "Grande Échelle Saint-Nicolas" to the east, which led to the former Basilica of St. Nicolas located to the north (oriented east/west, this church presented the southern side of its nave, through which one entered the sanctuary). It was only in 1834 that the buildings between these two streets were demolished to clear the space, which later took the name "Place Saint-Nicolas". The construction of the current basilica spanned from 1844 to 1869.

In 1852, at no. 7 of the square (at the corner of the Rue Saint-Nicolas), the Radigois stationery store opened, which, for 167 years, remained one of the most famous and oldest businesses in Nantes. Purchased in 1933 by the Péan couple, their grandson was forced to close it in April 2019 due to the lack of a buyer. A restaurant is set to occupy the vacant commercial space.

In January 2017, redevelopment work on the square began, notably replacing the asphalt surface with beige granite paving, consistent with that already present on the nearby Place Royale. A large tree was also planted at the junction with the Rue Affre (which has also become a pedestrian zone), at the base of which seats were installed. This eight-month pedestrianization project enhanced the facade of the basilica.

== Notable buildings and places of memory ==
The Basilica of St. Nicolas is listed as a historic monument by decree of 6 November 1986.

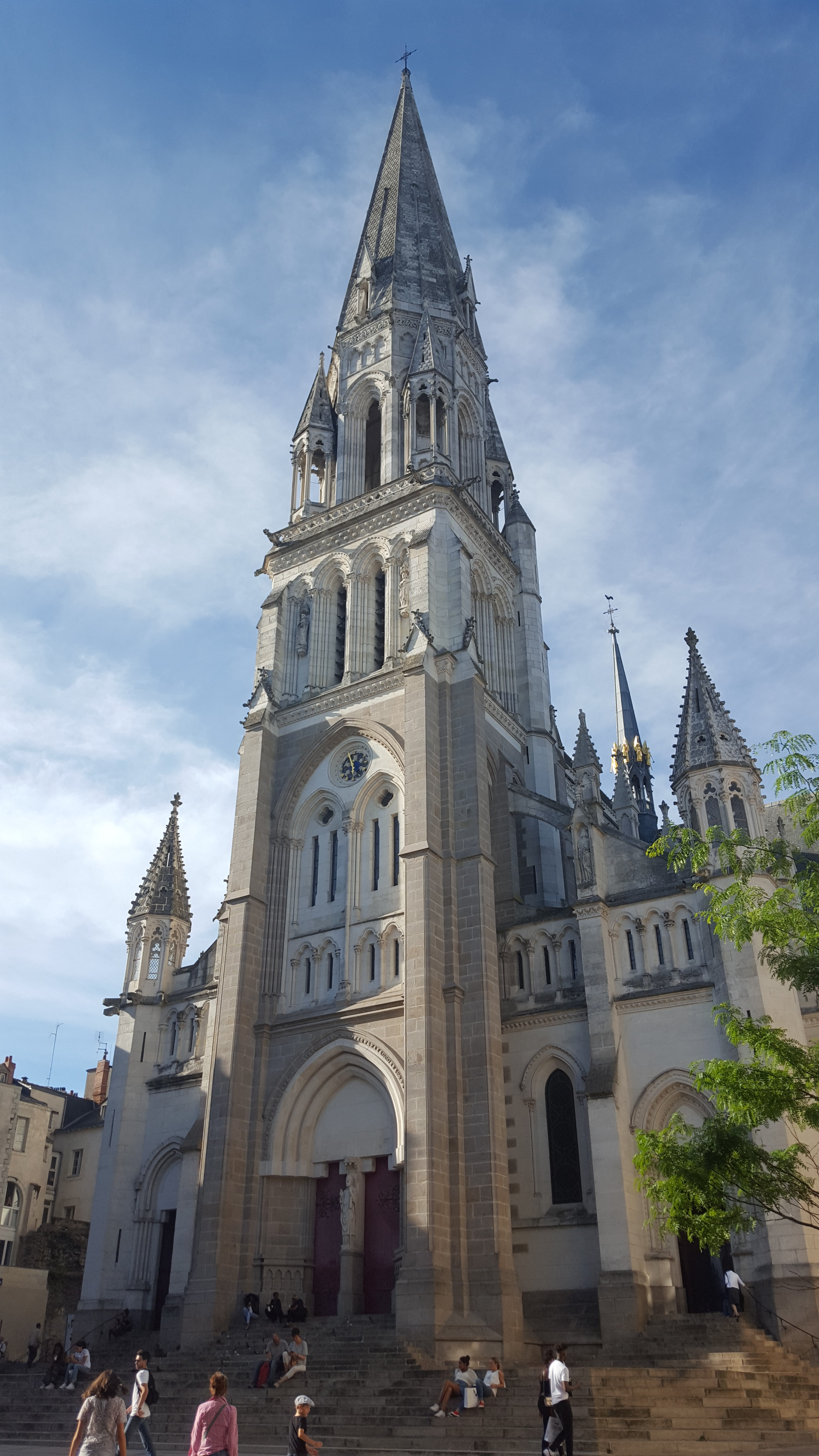
The Basilica of St. Nicolas

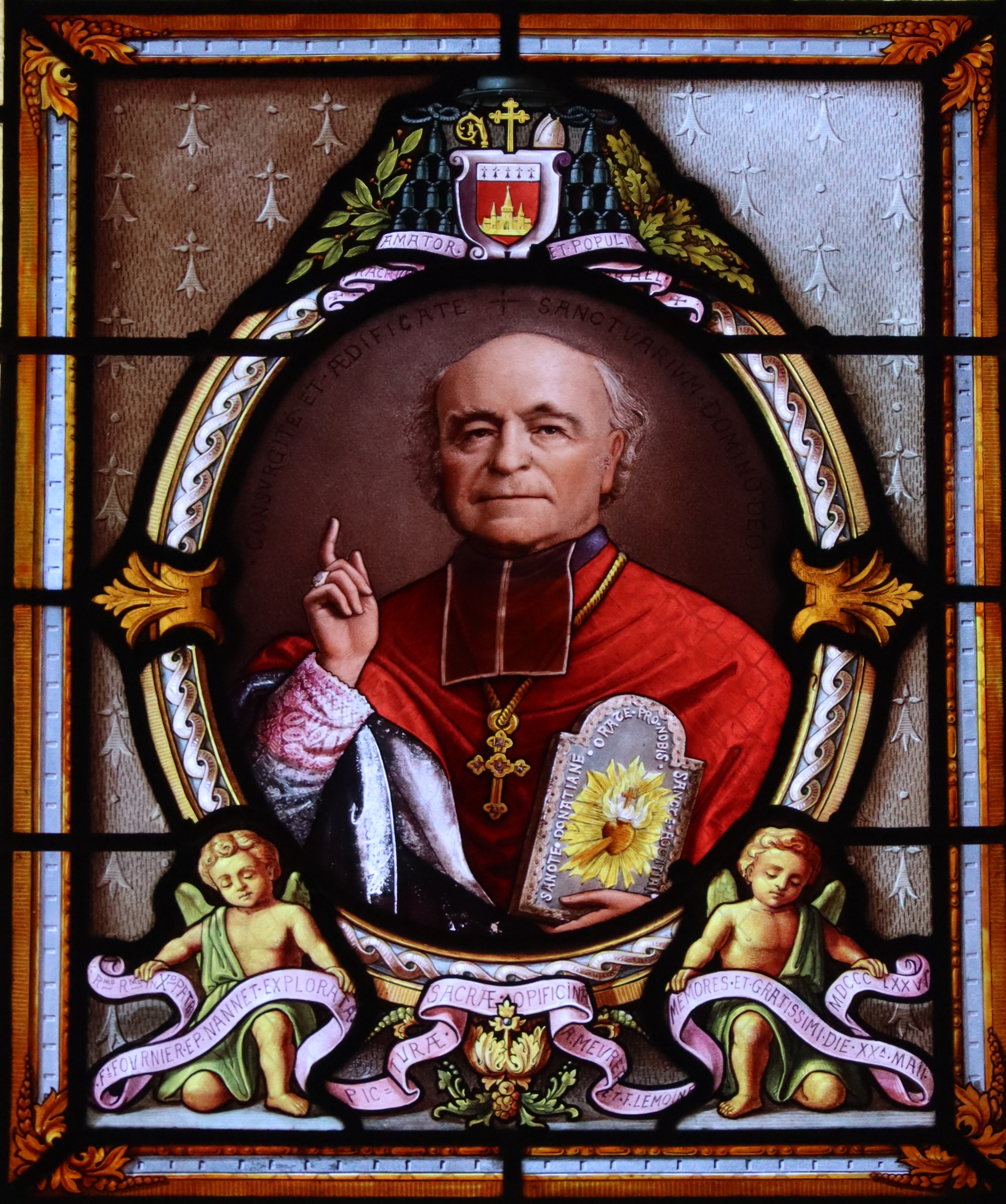
Stained glass window in the Saint-Nicolas Basilica depicting Félix Fournier

== See also ==
- Place Royale, Nantes

=== Bibliography ===
- Lelièvre, Pierre (1988). Nantes au XVIIIe siècle: urbanisme et architecture [Nantes in the 18th century: urbanism and architecture]. Architectures (in French). Paris: Éditions Picard. p. 295. ISBN 2-7084-0351-6.
- Collectif (1978). Iconographie de Nantes [Iconography of Nantes] (in French). Nantes: Musée Dobrée. p. 224. Iconographie.
- Collectif (1986). Mathurin Crucy (1749-1826): architecte nantais néo-classique [Mathurin Crucy (1749-1826): neoclassical architect from Nantes] (in French). Nantes: Musée Dobrée. p. 154. Crucy.
- Pajot, Stéphane (2010). Nantes histoire de rues [Nantes history of streets] (in French). Les Sables d'Olonne: d'Orbestier. p. 215. ISBN 978-2-84238-126-4.
- Rault, Jean-Pierre; Sigot, Jacques (1996). Les Noms des rues de Nantes [The Names of the Streets of Nantes]. Découverte (in French). Éditions CMD. p. 400. ISBN 978-2-909826-36-3.
- Université de Nantes. Service formation continue dont université permanente (1984). Çà et là par les rues de Nantes [Here and there through the streets of Nantes] (in French). Nantes: Reflets du passé. p. 207. ISBN 2-86507-016-6. Université.
- Pied, Édouard (1906). Notices sur les rues de Nantes [Notices on the streets of Nantes] (in French). A. Dugas.

=== External links ===
- Municipal Archives of Nantes
