= Bombings in Nantes =

Part of World War 2 (1943)

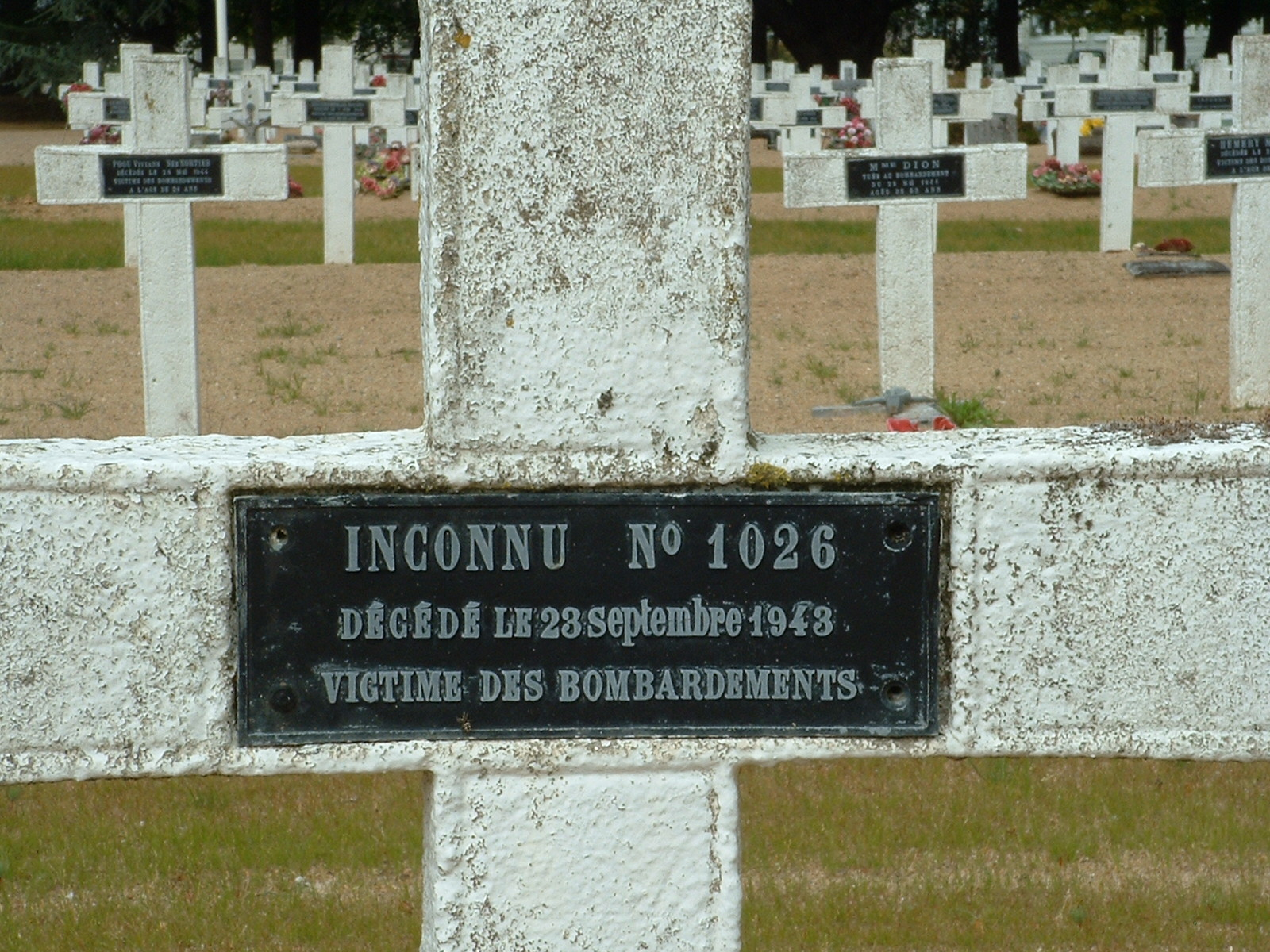
- Grave of an unidentified victim of the 23 September bombardment at Chauvinière Cemetery.
- Location: Nantes and surroundings
- Date: 16 and 23 September 1943
- Attack type: Air bombing
- Deaths: 1,463
- Injuries: Around 2,500
- Victim: Civilians
- Perpetrator: Allies
- Motive: Strategy

The bombings on 16 and 23 September 1943 were strategic air raids carried out by the Allies during World War II, on Nantes, France. These bombings constituted the deadliest and most destructive air raids to be carried out in the Nantes area (comprising Nantes and Saint-Herblain, among other municipalities) throughout the war.

== Objectives ==
The squadrons sought to destroy the port of Nantes, with a particular focus on the support vessels for German submarines and raiders (tankers and supply ships) moored at the Quai de la Fosse, as well as the German military airbase at Château-Bougon, situated five kilometers southwest of Nantes and the Loire River. It was from this location that the Luftwaffe launched aircraft to bomb England. The nearby aviation factory was severely damaged in a previous raid on 4 July 1943. However, rather than flying along the Loire to target the quays, the bombers, arriving from the north, crossed the city at a perpendicular angle at a considerable altitude, resulting in the scattering of their bombs over the city. Consequently, most of the bombs failed to reach their intended targets and instead crashed into the city center.

It appears that the quay and bridges were not significantly damaged, as evidenced by their continued functionality less than a year later, in August 1944. Before the city's evacuation by the German army, the latter took measures to sabotage these structures, thereby impeding the advancement of the American army.

== German defense and civil defense ==
As early as 1938, Nantes had established a civil defense system (headquartered in the Hôtel Rosmadec, one of the buildings of the City Hall) that allowed residents to take shelter. However, on the German side, there was no reaction from the Flak (anti-aircraft defense). During the second bombing on 23 September, the Germans set up smoke screens to obscure visibility.

== Bombings ==
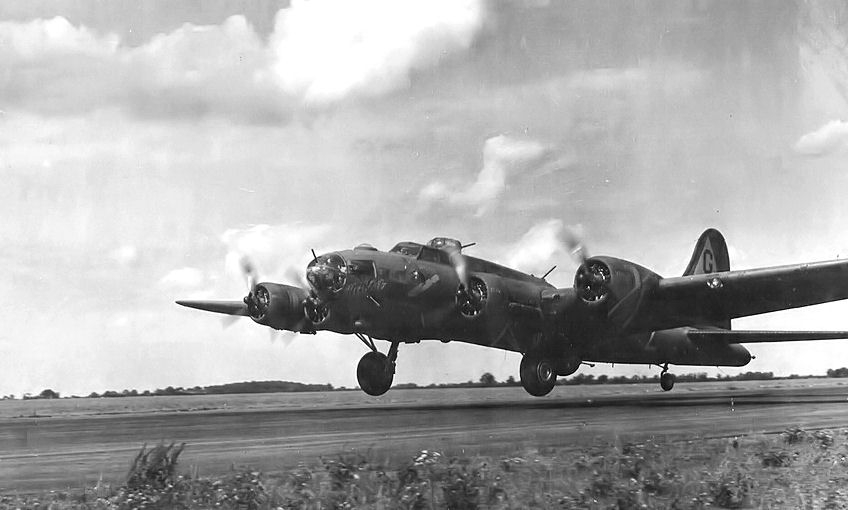
Boeing B-17 Flying Fortress of the 8th Air Force, identical to those which carried out the bombardments.

Given that the center of Nantes had never been bombed, the civilian population of Nantes did not take the alerts seriously. They had become accustomed to hearing alarms that ultimately announced planes heading to bomb Saint-Nazaire over several months. Consequently, few people made their way to shelters when the sirens sounded. However, by 16 August 1943 Nantes had already experienced 373 alerts and nine bombings that had killed 33 people.

=== 16 September 1943 ===
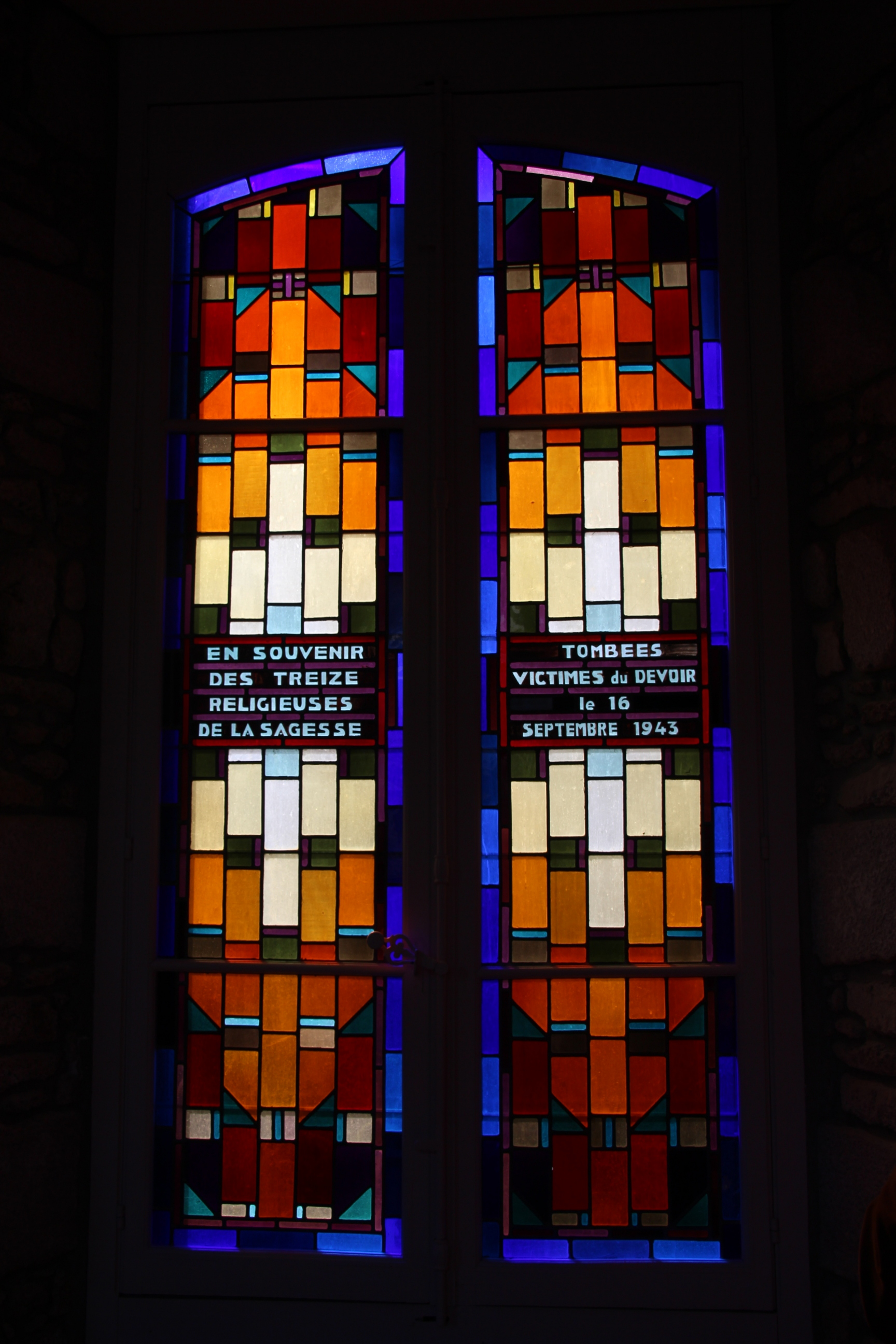
Stained glass window from the former chapel of Hôpital Saint-Jacques (Nantes) commemorating the death of 13 Sagesse nuns in the 16 September bombardment. The stained glass windows from this chapel are now in Saint-Laurent-sur-Sèvre (Vendée), at the religious congregation's motherhouse.

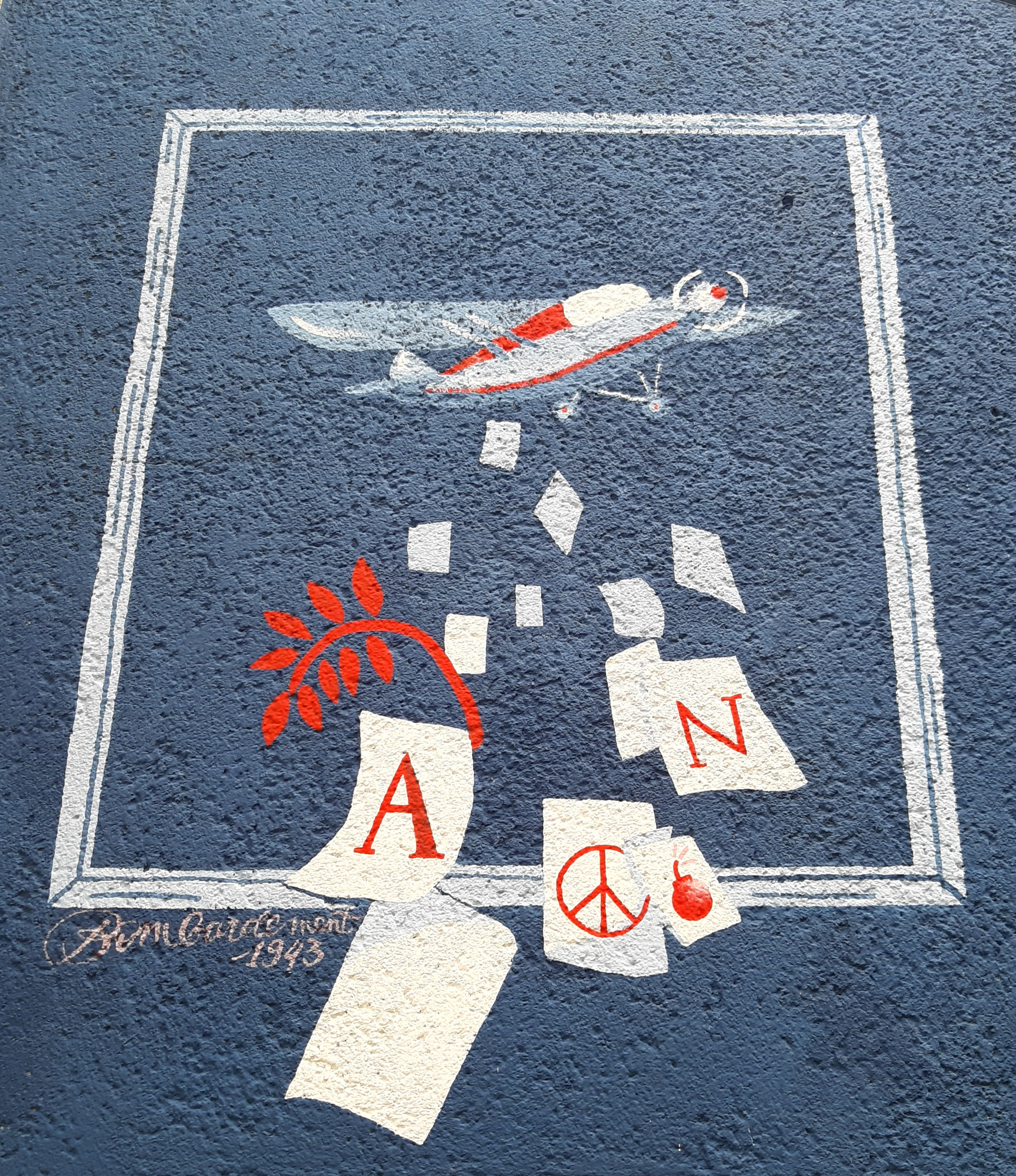
Fresco evoking the 1943 bombings, rue d'Ancin.

At approximately 3:30 p.m., the sirens began to sound. Approximately ten minutes later, 147 B-17 Fortresses from the U.S. 8th Air Force flew over the city. At 4:05 p.m., the initial American aerial bombardment of Nantes commenced. The impact was not uniform across the city; various districts, including the Butte Sainte-Anne and the Ateliers et Chantiers de Bretagne, were affected. The Hôtel-Dieu, which was housing 800 patients at the time, was struck by 47 bombs, resulting in the deaths of 40 patients and 36 injuries among the hospital staff. In fifteen minutes, 1,450 bombs were dropped on 600 impact points within the city and its surrounding area. The city center, which had been severely damaged, received 130 projectiles, which triggered numerous fires, particularly in Rue du Calvaire, Place Royale, and the Basilica of Saint-Nicolas.

=== 23 September 1943 ===
A new air raid was initiated against the city, as the objectives set out for the Allies had not been fully achieved on 16 September. Six groups from the 8th Air Force were ordered to bomb the port of Nantes. At 9:14 a.m., the first planes flew over the city, and the alarm was sounded. At approximately 9:20 a.m., the first bombs were dropped on the port area.

At 6:55 p.m., another alarm sounded, indicating the return of approximately one hundred B-17s to bomb the city.

== Casualties ==
=== Human casualties ===
In total, 1,463 civilians were killed and more than 2,500 were injured during these bombings. A burning chapel of rest was set up in the Musée des Beaux-Arts. In the days following the attacks, 10,000 people were left homeless.

=== Material damage ===
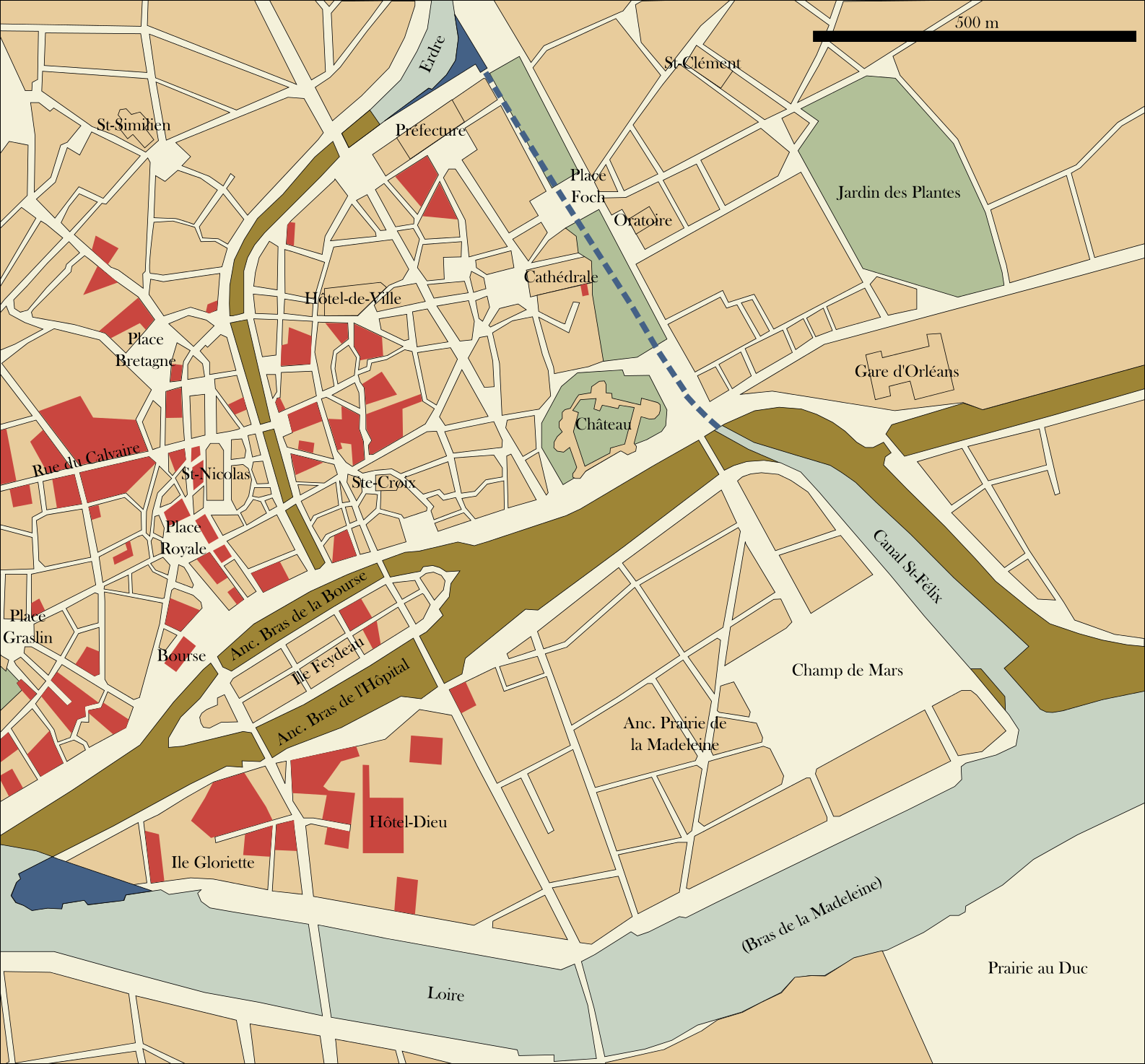
Map of downtown Nantes, showing in red the buildings destroyed or badly damaged by the American bombing raids of 1943.

The devastation was extensive, with over 700 houses and buildings destroyed and an additional 3,000 rendered uninhabitable. The Hôtel-Dieu sustained significant damage (approximately 60% of the building was rendered unusable), resulting in the Hôpital Saint-Jacques becoming the primary medical facility in Nantes until the reconstruction of a new Hôtel-Dieu (which commenced operation in 1964). A considerable quantity of sugar, estimated at thousands of tons, was destroyed in the Chamber of Commerce. A witness account describes the Decré department stores as "a gigantic lying skeleton." The Maison des Tourelles, which was heavily damaged, was subsequently demolished on the Quai de la Fosse.

== Consequences ==
As a consequence of these three bombings, a considerable migration of Nantes residents (approximately two-thirds of the population) occurred to neighboring municipalities, including Thouaré, Vertou, La Chapelle-sur-Erdre, and others. A public notice was issued.

The residents of Nantes harbored some resentment due to the tragic inaccuracy of these bombings, which may partially explain the slow development of the resistance movement in Nantes at the end of the war. Vichy propaganda and collaborationist press capitalized on this resentment by once again denouncing the bombings of cities. They labeled the Allied pilots "Anglo-American pirates" who killed men, women, and children and claimed that these bombings were unjustified because the city of Nantes had no strategic interest.

In the aftermath of the devastation and loss of life, the residents of Nantes demonstrated a remarkable capacity for resilience and reconciliation. However, due to the extensive bombings, many of them did not participate in the festivities to celebrate the American troops when they entered the city on 12 August 1944.

== Memory ==
In 2014, the Esplanade des Victimes-des-bombardements-des-16-et-23-septembre-1943 was designated at the intersection of Cours Olivier-de-Clisson and Boulevard Jean-Philippot.

Annually, commemorative ceremonies are conducted on 16 September at the Chauvinière Cemetery, the final resting place of the victims.

A local odonym in Saint-Herblain (Rue du 16-Septembre) commemorates these events.

In her film Jacquot de Nantes, Agnès Varda evokes the effects of the bombings through the recollections of Jacques Demy, who was twelve years old at the time and was profoundly impacted by this traumatic event.

== See also ==
- Strategic bombing during World War II

== Bibliography ==
- Jame, Bernard (2005). Nantes souffrance 1943 (in French). Maulévrier: Éditions Hérault. ISBN 978-2-740-70218-5.
- Ville de Nantes - Lycée professionnel Michelet (2005). Témoignages sur les bombardements des 16 et 23 septembre 1943 à Nantes (in French). Ville de Nantes.
- Scheid, Michel (1994). Nantes, 1940-1944 : la guerre, l'occupation, la libération. Une ville pendant la guerre (in French). Rennes Caen: Ouest-France; Mémorial de Caen. ISBN 978-2-737-31561-9.
- Gille, Jocelyn (1993). Nantes dans la tourmente : 1939-1944 (in French). Pontchâteau: J. Gille. ISBN 978-2-950-65071-9.
- Thomas, Patrick (1996). Nantes : les bombardements (in French). Vol. 3. Montreuil-Bellay: Editions C.M.D. ISBN 978-2-909-82641-7.
- Caillaud, Paul (1978). Nantes sous les bombardements 1941-1945 (in French). Éditions Nantes.
