= Pierre I of Chaffault =

15th-century bishop from the Duchy of Brittany

Pierre Proufilt du Chaffault was a 15th-century ecclesiastic and scholar of canon law from the Duchy of Brittany. He was Bishop of Nantes from 10 March 1477 until his death in 1487.

== Life ==
Cardinal François-Marie Richard wrote of Pierre's election as bishop :

This was a virtuous and able man. He only accepted the episcopal dignity on the condition that the Régale dispute was ended, protesting with an oath that he would neither carry a crozier or wear a mitre until peace returned to his Church. We soon see what can be done by the influence of a man who seeks nothing except God's glory and the Church's holy freedom. Pierre du Chaffault did not hesitate to make peace. From the start of his episcopate, he wrote in diocesan statutes "We pray each and every one of the acts done by the bishops of Nantes, our predecessors, for their honour, glory, defence of rights, freedoms, immunities and franchises, as well as the glorious customs of our Church in Nantes; and treading in our predecessors' footsteps, we approve these acts."

He made peace within his diocese by taking the oath of loyalty to Francis II of Brittany that Amaury d'Acigné and Jacques d'Elbiest (his two predecessors as bishop) had refused to take and that had been one of the pretexts for the War of the Public Weal. In 1481 he, the Bishop of Saint-Malo and the Bishop of Quimper appealed to Bargius, papal legate to Pope Sixtus IV. In 1480 he had a breviary using Arabic numerals (much earlier than they were previously thought to be used in France) printed in Vannes and in 1482 a missal in Venice including ceremonies unique to Nantes. In 1483 he personally travelled to Rome, only returning to his diocese three years later.

His tomb in the Saint-Félix Chapel at Nantes Cathedral includes the epitaph "Prudent Pierre, precious prelate, close to God, they say he is caught" ("Pierre Prélat prudent, précieux près Dieu, aiant prins […]"). A book of hours printed in Nantes in 1517 contains a prayer in his honour. Dom Lobineau, a 17th-century Benedictine monk, wrote:

When Pierre du Chaffault died on 6 November 1487, he left behind such a great reputation for sanctity that for a long while people went to pray at his tomb and it is said that he worked several miracles there.

== Bibliography ==
- (in French) Pierre-Hyacinthe Morice de Beaubois, Histoire ecclesiastique et civile de Bretagne, de l'imprimerie de Delaguette, 1756, p. 136-137
- (in French) Louis-Gabriel Michaud, Biographie universelle, ancienne et moderne, Volume 7, Michaud frères, 1813, p. 616
- (in French) Cardinal François-Marie Benjamin Richard de la Vergne, Vie de la bienheureuse, volumes 1 and 2, V. Forest et É. Grimaud, 1865
