= Félix Fournier =

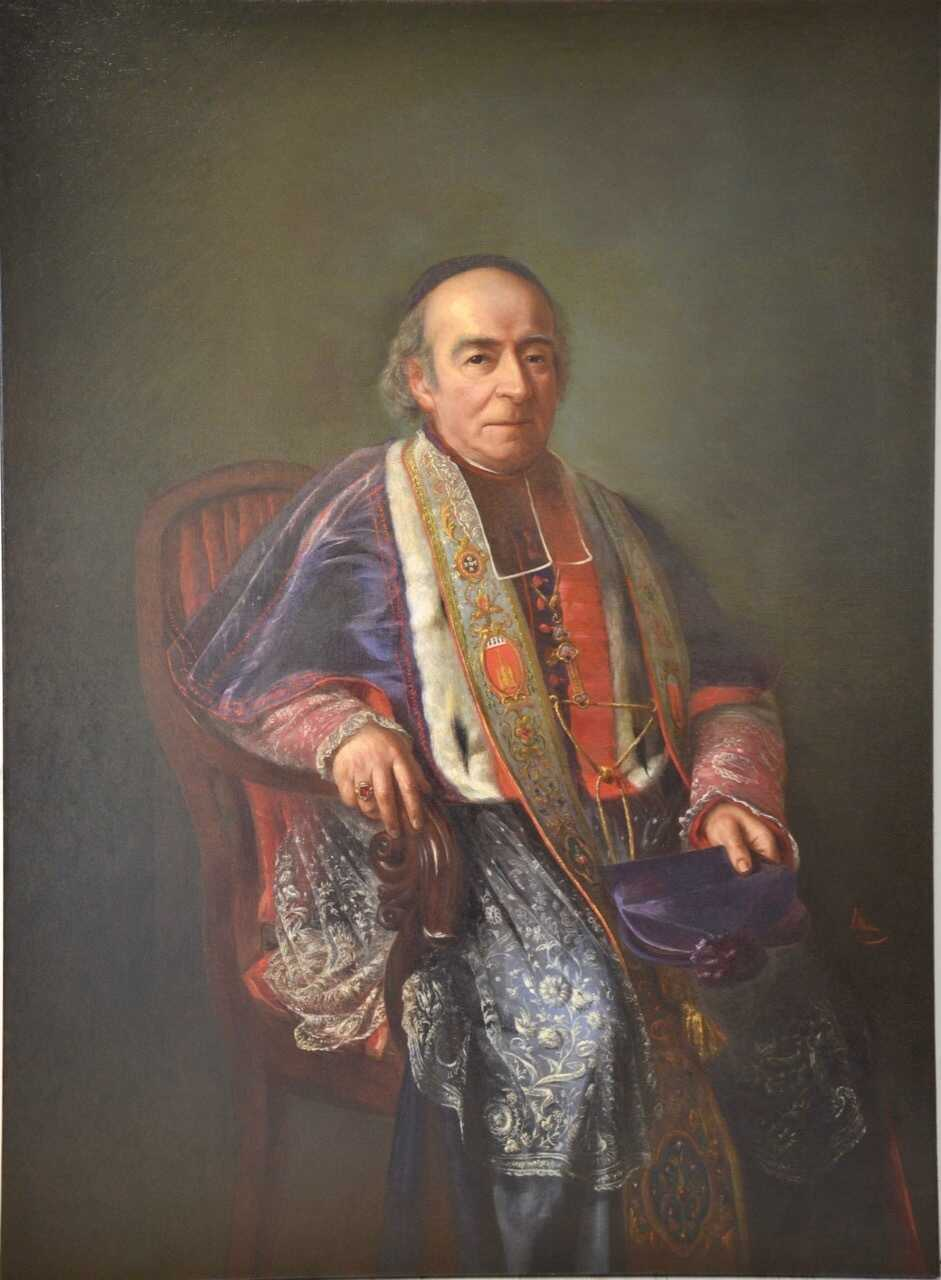

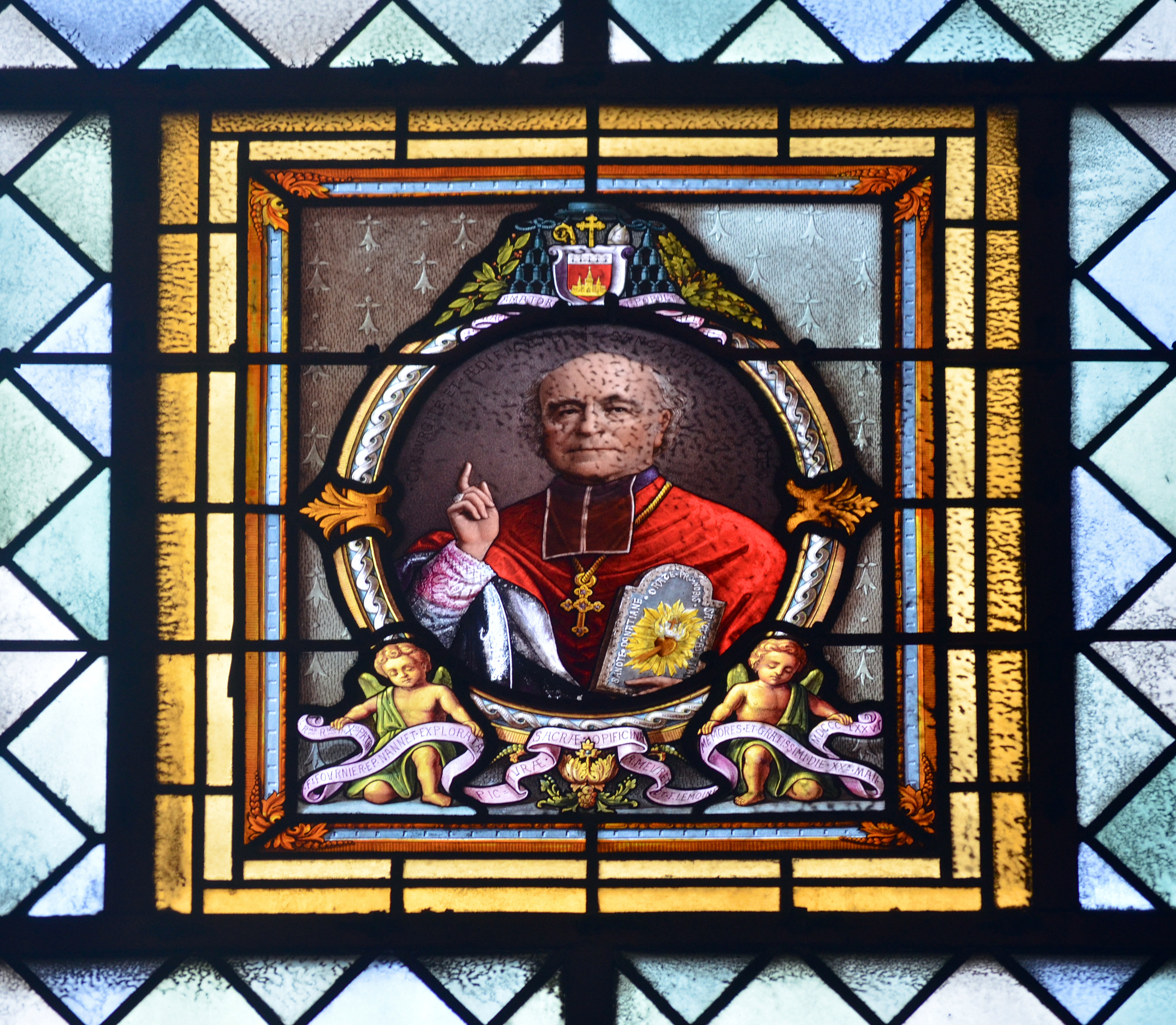
Félix Fournier

Félix Fournier (3 May 1803 - 9 June 1877) was a dignitary of the Catholic Church, a French politician, and Bishop of Nantes from 1870 to his death in 1877.

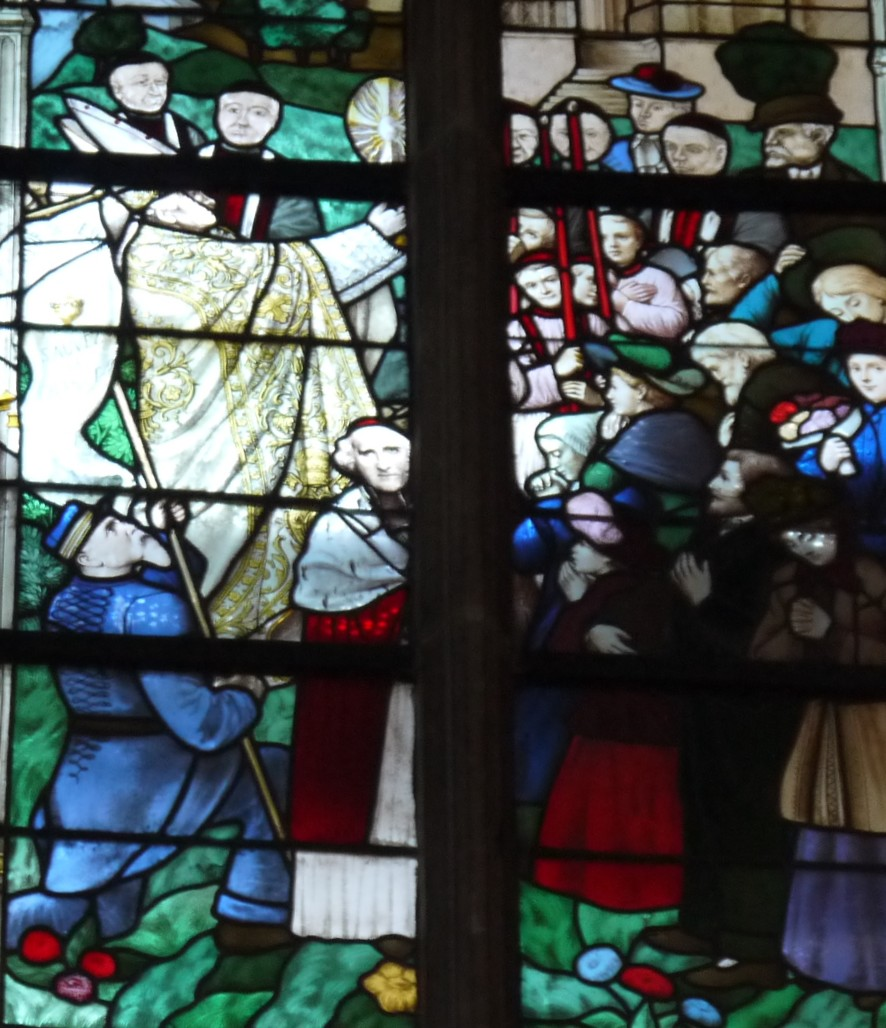
Fournier

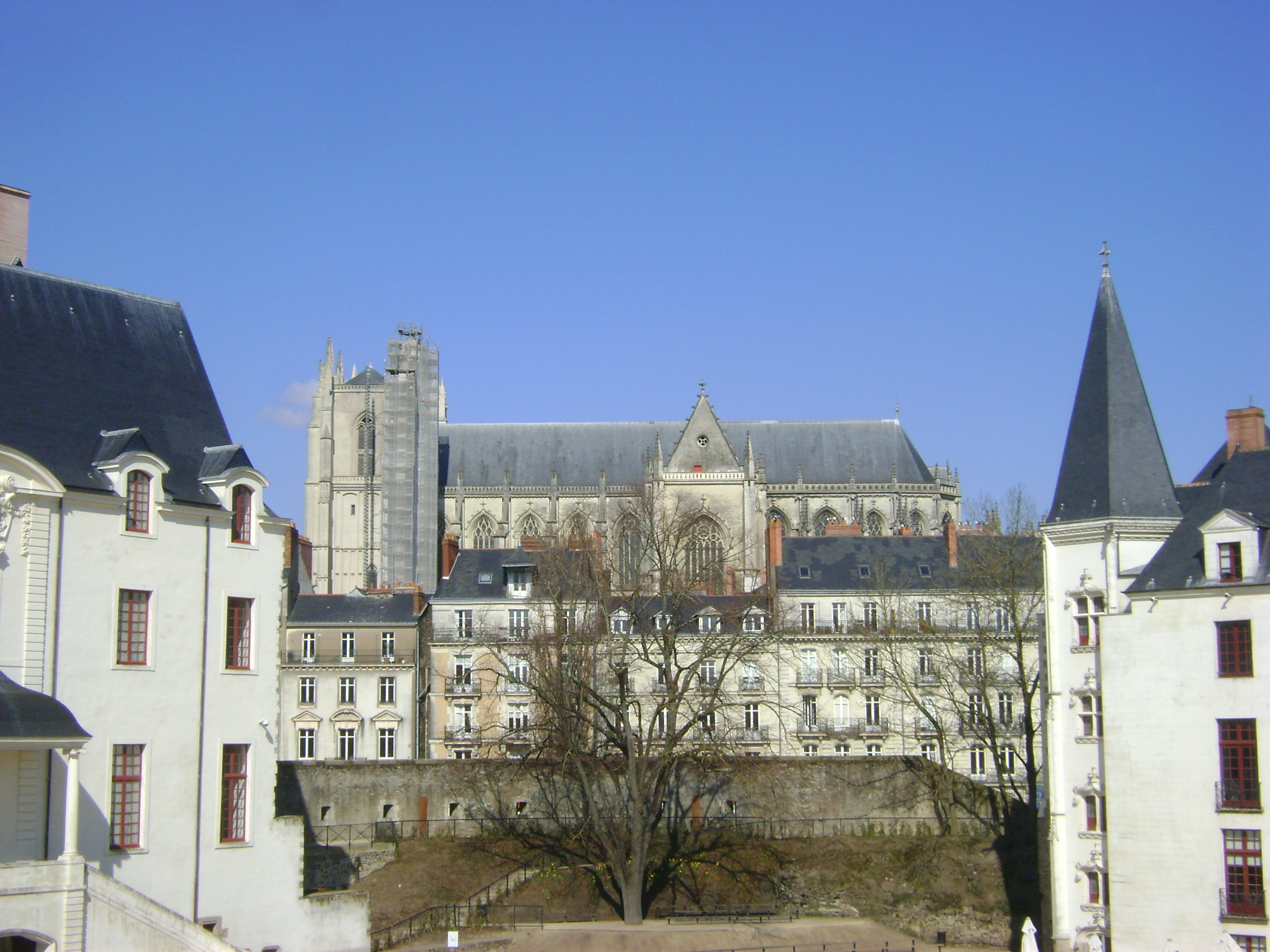
Cathédrale de Nantes.

== Biography ==
Félix Fournier was born on 3 May 1803 in Nantes and died on 9 June 1877 in Rome (Italy). Fournier was ordained in 1827. He was vicar and parish priest of the parish of Saint-Nicolas in Nantes from 1836 to 1870 before reaching the Bishopric.

Fournier was elected once, in 1848, as a deputy of Lower Loire and participated in the work of the Constituent Assembly where he sat on the right with the supporters of Bonapartism. Fournier played a decisive role in the completion work of the Cathedral of Nantes (inaugurated in 1891), trying to gain the government's interest and obtaining the necessary funding for completion. In 1837 he founded a local Society of Saint Vincent de Paul.

He died during a pilgrimage to Rome in 1877. His tomb was installed in 1883.

== Tributes ==
The courtyard of Basilica of St. Nicolas was named Place Félix Fournier in his memory at the end of the nineteenth century.

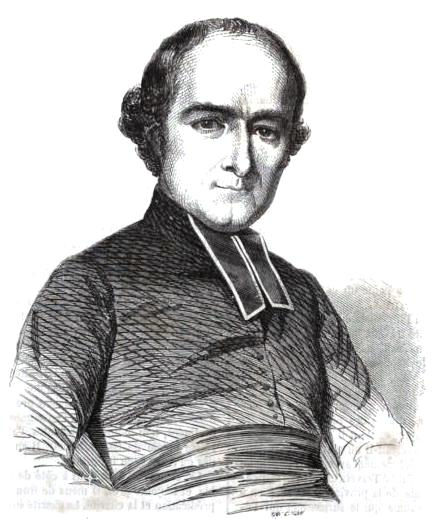
Félix Fournier.

Blason ofFélix Fournier.

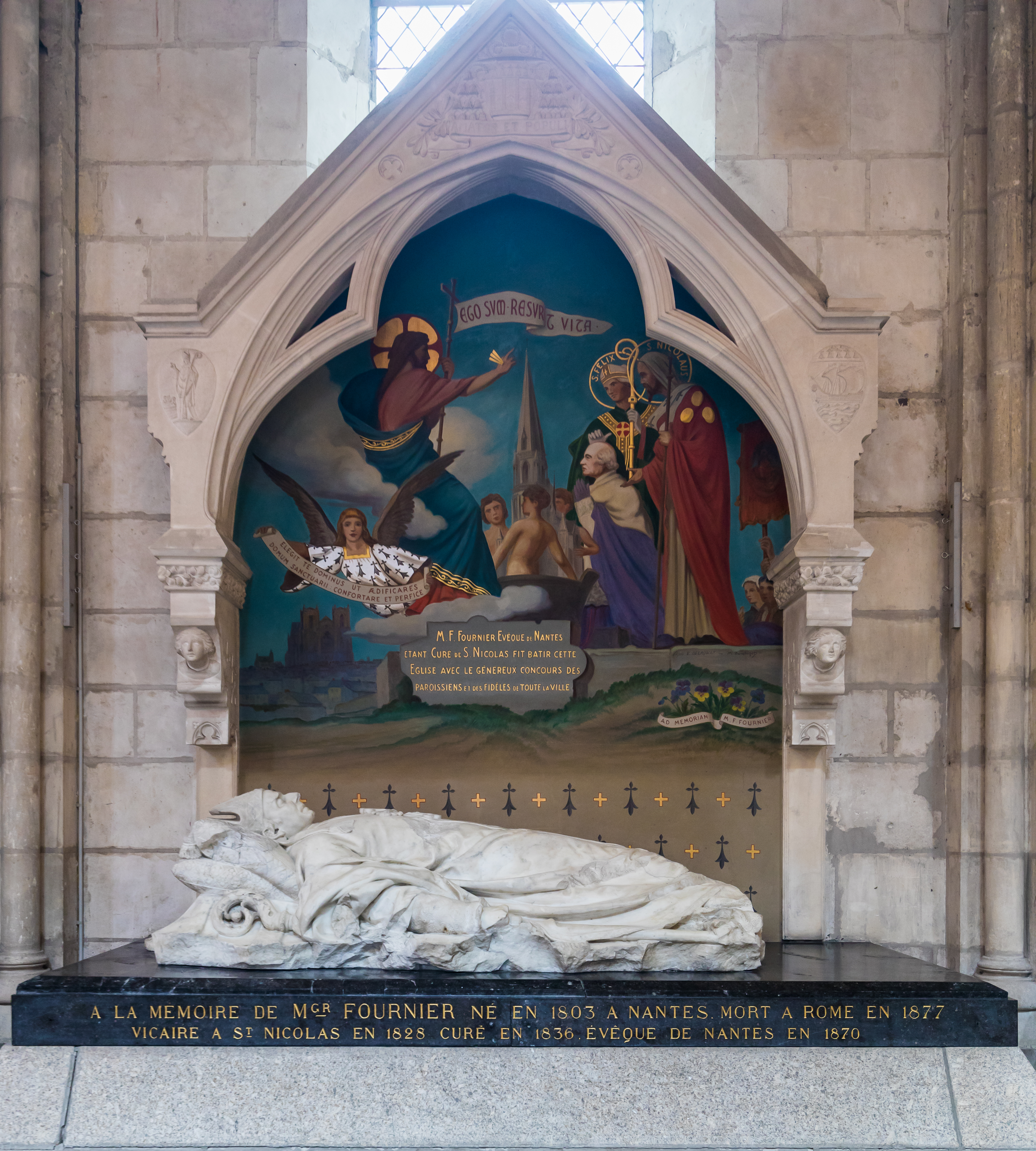
Tomb of Felix Fournier

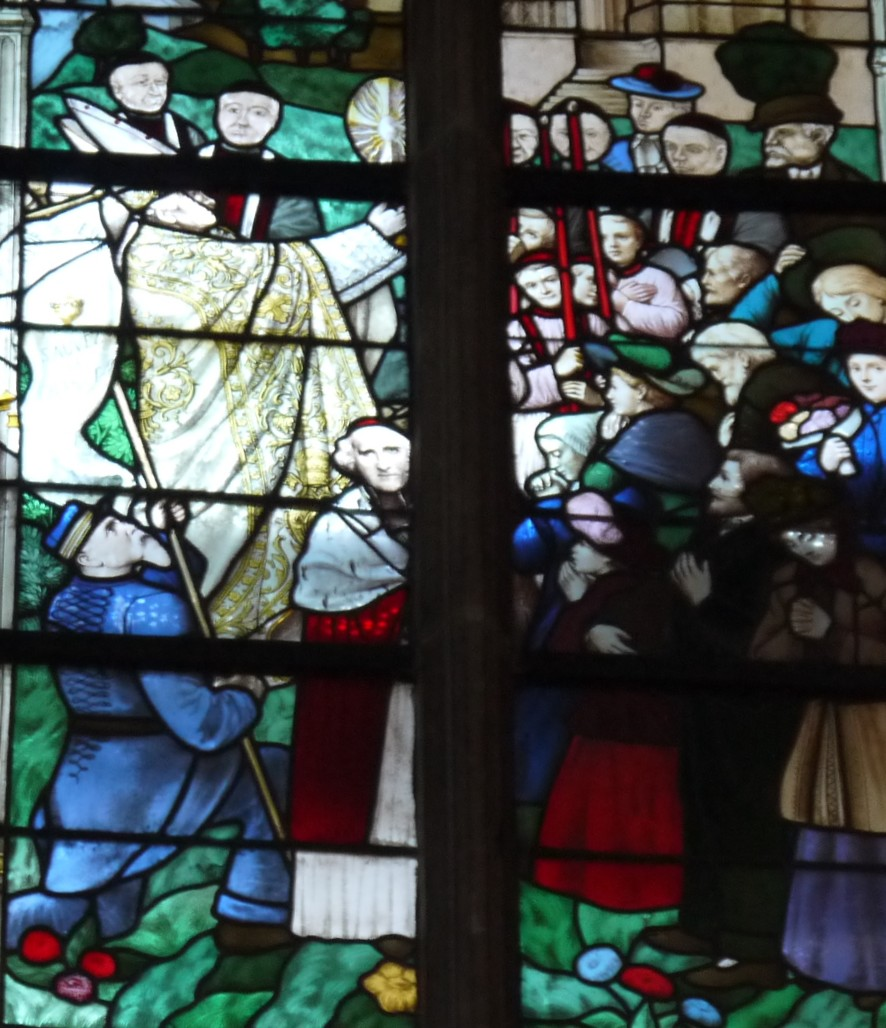
Fournier

== See also ==
- Catholic Church in France
