= Place Saint-Pierre, Nantes =

Square at Nantes, France

Place Saint-Pierre
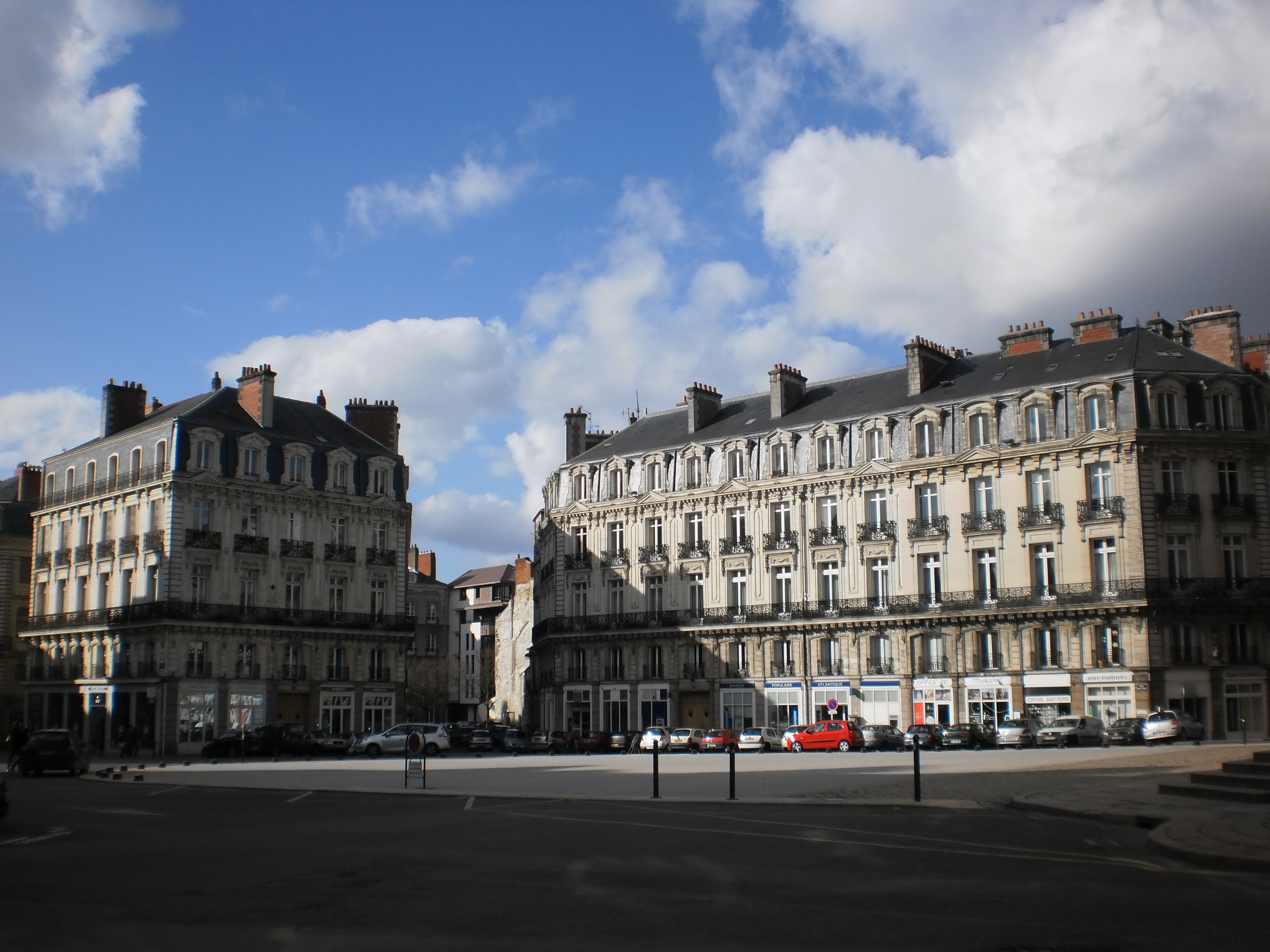
- Buildings lining the Place Saint-Pierre. In the foreground, the cathedral forecourt, with its steps visible on the right.

- Location within France
- Former name: Place des Gracches
- Type: Square
- Length: 60 m (200 ft)
- Width: 60 m
- Area: 3,600 m^{2}
- Location: Nantes, Pays de la Loire
- Coordinates: 47°13′05″N 1°33′05″W

Construction
- Completion: Ancient history, 1867–1872

The Place Saint-Pierre is a public square in Nantes, France. It is situated to the east of Nantes Cathedral.

== Location and access ==
The square, situated at the center of Nantes, is accessible via six streets: Rue de l'Évêché and Rue du Roi-Albert to the northeast, Rue Portail to the northwest, Rue du Général-Leclerc-de-Hauteclocque to the west, Rue de Verdun to the southwest, and Rue Mathelin-Rodier to the southeast.

== Origin of the name ==
The square functions as the parvise of Nantes Cathedral, thereby inheriting the initial portion of the cathedral's name.

== History ==
The Place Saint-Pierre is located at the ancient city's eastern entrance, within the walls of the Gallo-Roman castrum, which was constructed after 270 AD. The first cathedral was erected on the site in the 4th century.

For an extended period, the square section between the cathedral and the Rue Saint-Laurent, located to the south, was utilized as a cemetery. This cemetery was only enclosed by a wall in 1592. In 1617, the cemetery was relocated.

On 5 September 1661, while visiting Nantes to attend the Estates of Brittany, King Louis XIV ordered the arrest of Nicolas Fouquet, his superintendent of finances. After a failed attempt in front of the Château des Ducs de Bretagne, Charles de Batz-Castelmore D'Artagnan, a musketeer serving the king, successfully apprehended Fouquet in the square in front of the cathedral.

Before the 18th century, the Place Saint-Pierre was one of the few public squares in the city and the sole one of considerable size. Its establishment was closely associated with the cathedral. In contrast, other squares, such as Bouffay, Change, and Saint-Nicolas, were primarily utilitarian, serving economic functions. The Place Saint-Pierre also functioned as a crossroads, at the intersection of the road to Paris and the Porte Saint-Pierre.

In the early 18th century, the municipality was responsible for paving the square (while residents were responsible for paving the streets), as well as maintaining a public well (the city had thirteen wells in 1748). In the view of art historian Pierre Lelièvre, the square was not designed to accommodate a market, except on an occasional basis. For example, in 1740, some merchants, displaced from the overcrowded Bouffay market, were permitted to set up temporary stalls in the Place Saint-Pierre. However, Yves Durand notes that the square served as a gathering place for merchants of fruit and vegetables. In 1756, the mayor ordered the removal of commercial establishments that had been established at the cathedral's side exits.

The initial proposal for the square's expansion was put forth by Pierre Vigna de Vigny (1690–1772). His project involved the demolition of certain buildings on the square's north side to create a sense of visual symmetry with the cathedral. At the time, the buildings' facades on this side were aligned with the cathedral's central entrance. The proposed enlargement would have shaped the square into a large rectangle, with a semicircular section facing the cathedral. Vigna de Vigny also proposed this type of square for the Chamber of Accounts and City Hall. However, the project was never executed.

During the French Revolution, the square was renamed Place des Gracques.

In 1860, Henri-Théodore Driollet also devised a plan to expand the square. Ultimately, the competition for the esplanade's redesign was won by Eugène Demangeat, a Nantes-born architect based in Paris who had previously won the second Prix de Rome. The square was demolished in 1867 and subsequently rebuilt between 1868 and 1872. The cathedral's construction, which had spanned 437 years, was completed in 1891.

== Notable buildings and landmarks ==
Nantes Cathedral, constructed between 1434 and 1891, is the square's dominant feature. It has been designated a historic monument since 1862. The cathedral's Gothic architectural style, tuffeau stone construction, and height of 63 meters contribute to its prominence. Additionally, the cathedral houses the tomb and effigies of Duke Francis II of Brittany and his wife, Marguerite de Foix.

At the cathedral's entrance, a four-step staircase, constructed during the square's leveling in 1867, accentuates its grandeur.

The 1868 alignment formed a regular square, measuring 60 meters on each side, bordered by identical five-story facades in the Haussmannian style. These facades feature shops on the ground floor and balconies made of cast iron on the upper floors.

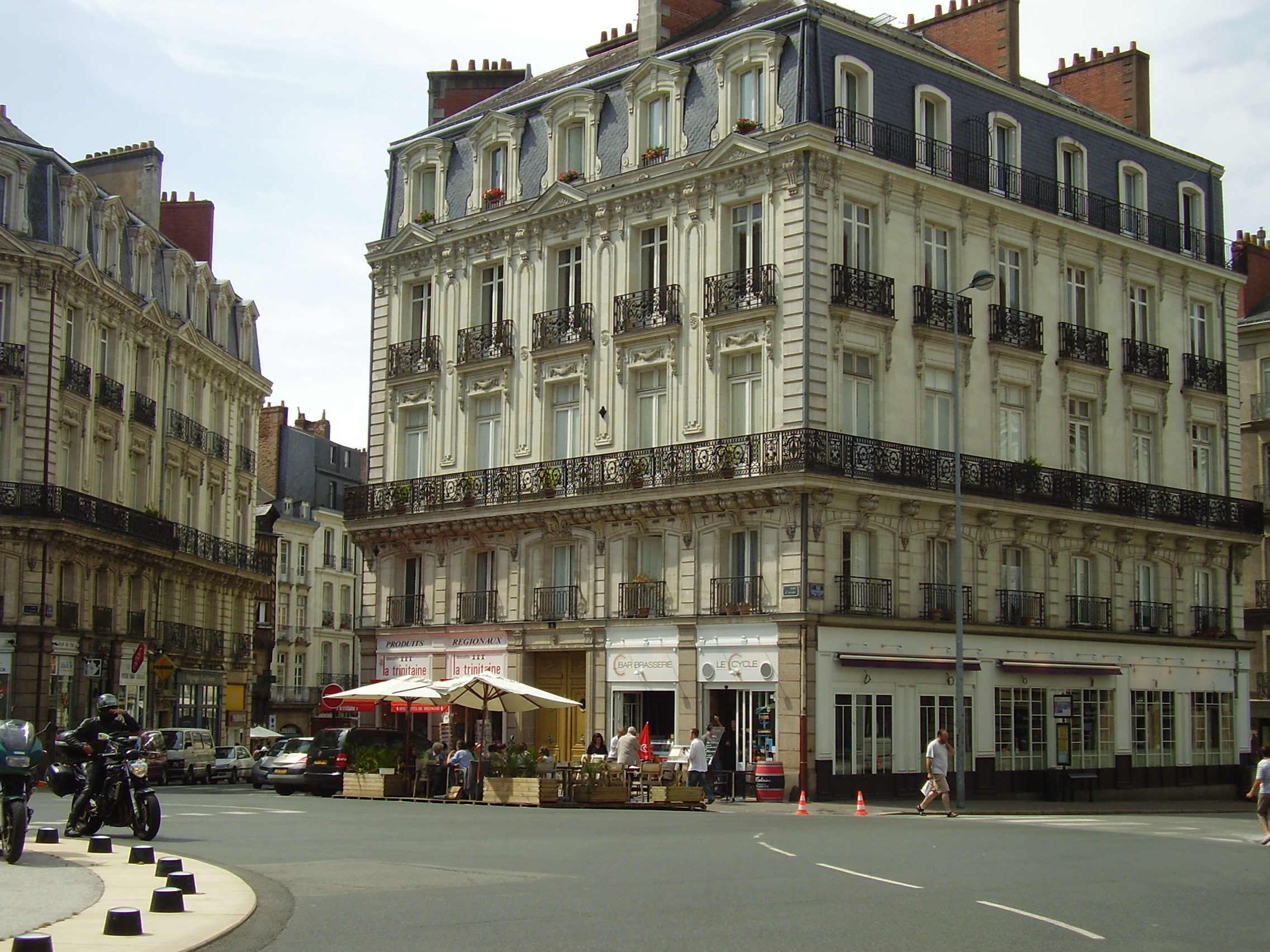
Building on the square's western part

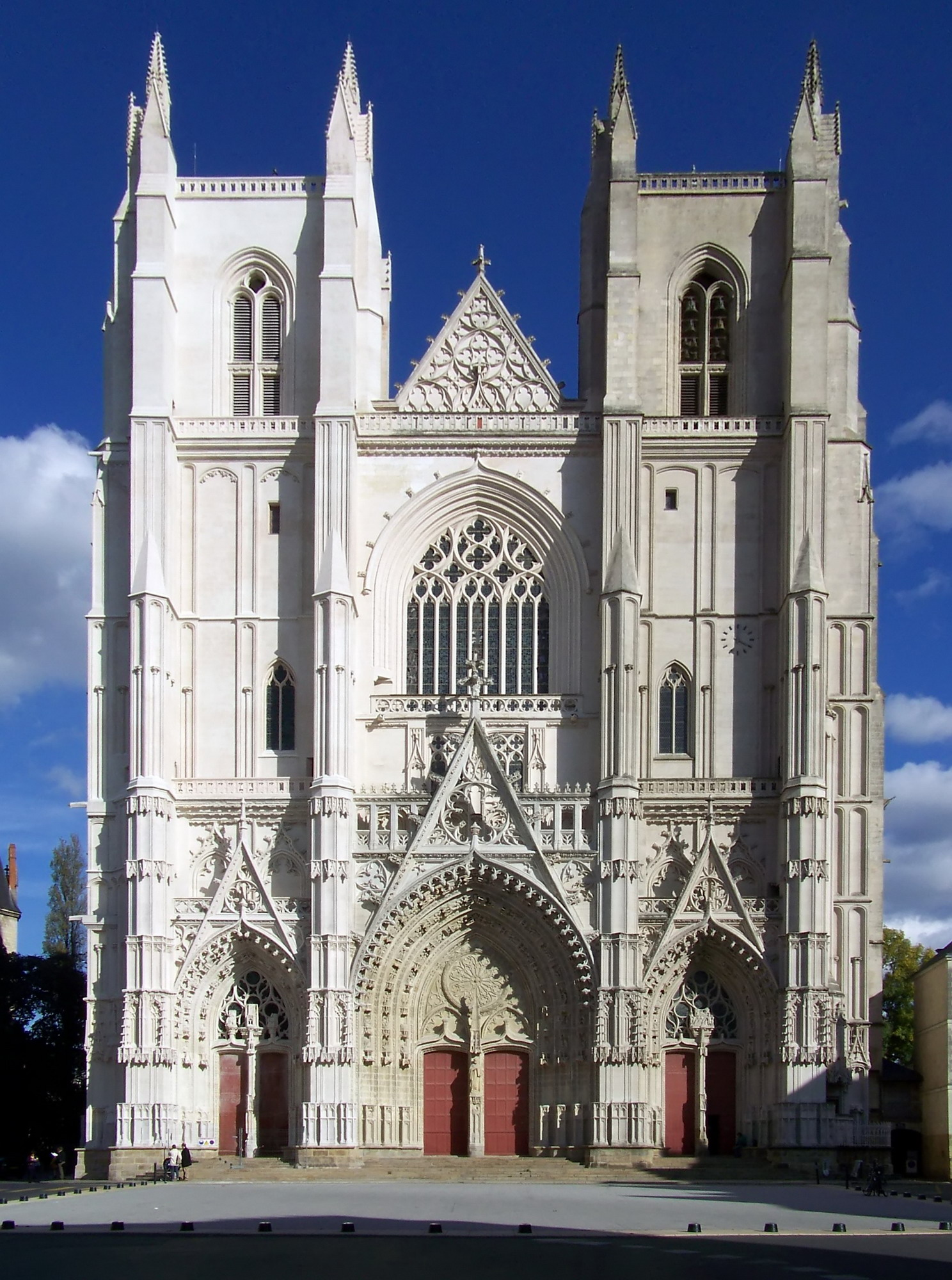
Cathedral's western facade and forecourt

== Cinema ==
The square served as the setting for the film L'Ironie du sort by Édouard Molinaro (1974).

== See also ==
- Place Royale, Nantes

== Bibliography ==
- Bois, Paul (1977). Histoire de Nantes [History of Nantes]. Univers de la France et des pays francophones (in French). Toulouse: Privat. ISBN 2-7089-4717-6.
- Flohic, Jean-Luc (1999). Le Patrimoine des communes de la Loire-Atlantique [Le Patrimoine des communes of Loire-Atlantique]. Le patrimoine des communes de France (in French). Vol. 2. Charenton-le-Pont: Flohic éditions. ISBN 2-84234-040-X.
- Kahn, Claude; Landais, Jean (1992). Nantes et les Nantais sous le Second Empire [Nantes and its people under the Second Empire] (in French). Nantes: Ouest éditions et Université inter-âges de Nantes. ISBN 2-908261-92-8.
- Lelièvre, Pierre (1988). Nantes au XVIIIe siècle : urbanisme et architecture [Nantes in the eighteenth century: urban planning and architecture]. Architectures (in French). Paris: Éditions Picard. ISBN 2-7084-0351-6.
- Leniaud, Jean-Michel; Bienvenu, Gilles; Curie, Pierre; Daboust, Véronique; Eraud, Dominique; Gros, Catherine; James, François-Charles; Riffet, Odette (1991). Nantes, la cathédrale : Loire-Atlantique [Nantes Cathedral: Loire-Atlantique]. Images du patrimoine (in French). Nantes: Inventaire général des monuments et des richesses artistiques de la France - commission régionale Pays de la Loire.
- Collectif (1978). Iconographie de Nantes [Iconography of Nantes] (in French). Nantes: Musée Dobrée.
- Collectif (1986). Mathurin Crucy (1749–1826) : architecte nantais néo-classique [Mathurin Crucy (1749–1826): neo-classical architect from Nantes] (in French). Nantes: Musée Dobrée.
- Pajot, Stéphane (1978). Nantes histoire de rues [Nantes street history] (in French). Les Sables d'Olonne: D'Orbestier. ISBN 978-2-84238-126-4.
- Pied, Édouard (1906). Notices sur les rues de Nantes (in French). A. Dugas. pp. 289–290.
- Université de Nantes. Service formation continue dont université permanente (1984). Çà et là par les rues de Nantes (in French). Nantes: Reflets du passé. ISBN 2-86507-016-6.
