= Cours Cambronne =

City square in Nantes, France

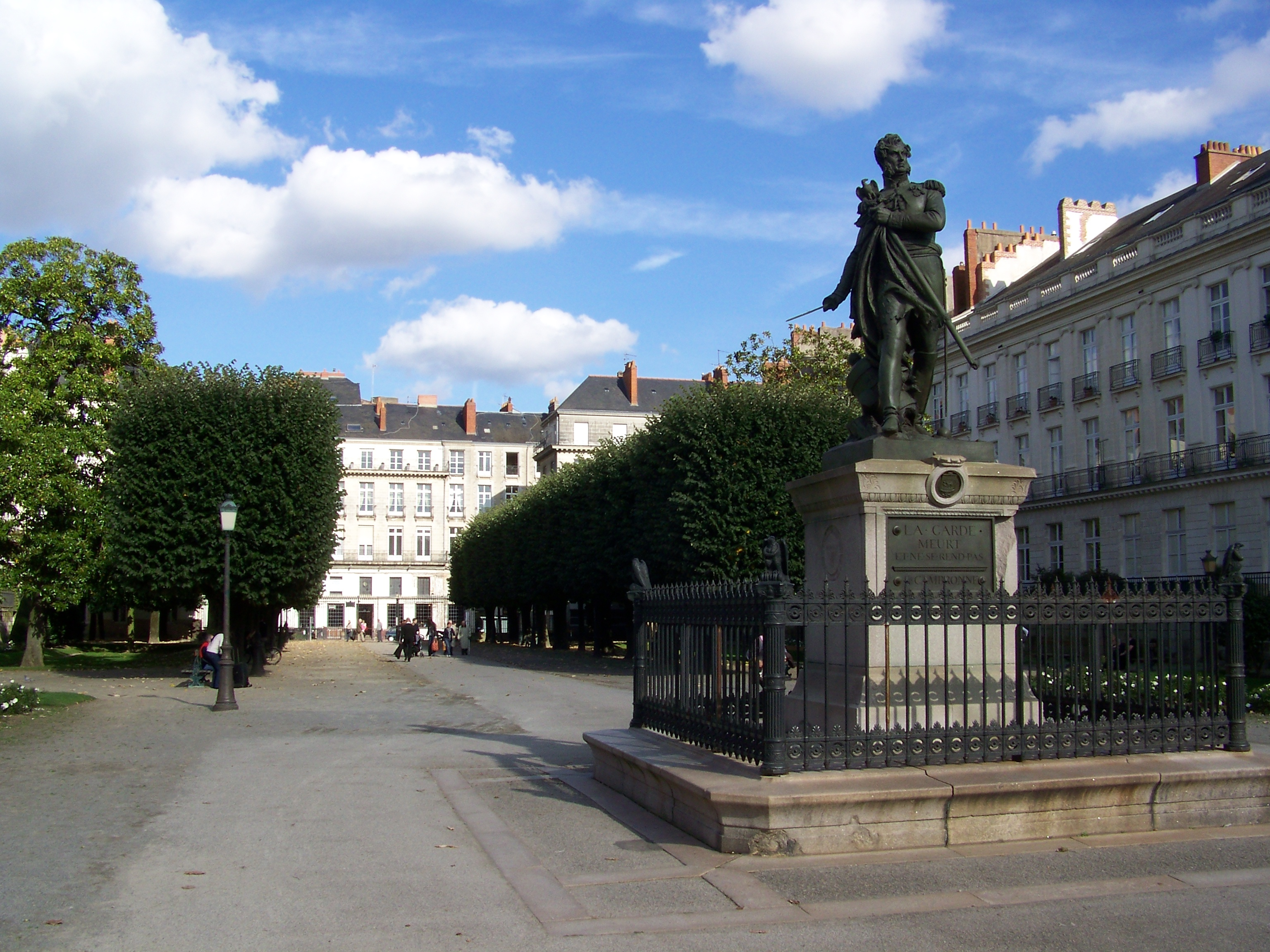
- The Cours Cambronne with the statue of General Cambronne in the foreground, renovated in 2008
- Interactive map of Cours Cambronne
- Type: Square
- Location: Nantes, Loire-Atlantique, France
- Coordinates: 47°12′43″N 1°33′47″W
- Area: 8,762 m^{2} (2.2 acres)
- Created: 1791
- Operator: City of Nantes
- Status: Open all year

The Cours Cambronne is a square in the city of Nantes, France.

== Location and access ==
Located in the city center of Nantes, the square is approximately 182 m (597 ft) long and 48 m (157 ft) wide, covering an area of 8,762 square metres (94,300 sq ft). Access is through wrought iron gates at both ends, on Rue Piron to the east and Rue des Cadeniers to the west. The west gate is also framed by two stone guardhouses. The Cours is bordered by rows of identical buildings on the north side (facing Rue Gresset) and the south side (facing Rue de l'Héronnière).

At the center of the square stands a statue of Pierre Cambronne, created by Nantes-born sculptor Jean Debay. The statue rests on a base designed by Henri-Théodore Driollet. One of the five Wallace fountains of Nantes is also located here; the fountain's sculptor, Charles-Auguste Lebourg, was also originally from Nantes.

The Cours is planted with silver linden trees, southern magnolias, and is decorated with lawns and flower beds.

== Name origin ==
The square is named after Pierre Cambronne, a general of the Empire. This name was adopted following the installation of his statue in 1848, reflecting popular usage among the citizens of Nantes.

== History ==
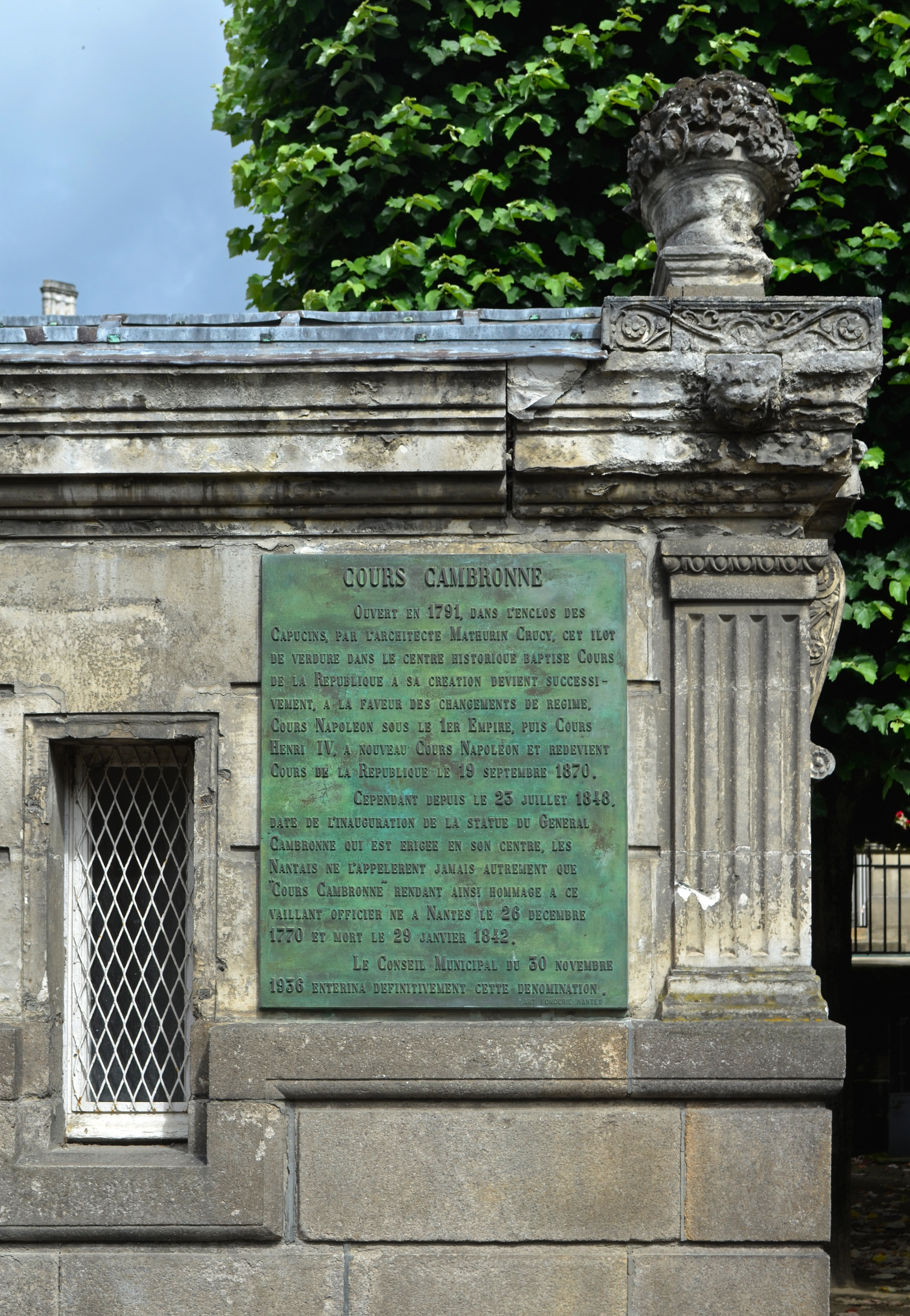
Plaque on the guardhouse wall at the west entrance of the Cours, detailing its history

The Catholic religious order of the Capuchin friars arrived in Nantes in 1593, under the patronage of Duke of Mercœur, and were established in the faubourg du Marchix (now the area around the Place de Bretagne). In 1629, the monks founded a new convent above the quai de la Fosse, with a surrounding estate. The convent chapel was located on what is now Rue Piron, and the cloister was approximately at the current number 4 Rue de l'Héronnière; a small grove extended around the present-day Rue Voltaire and Rue Gresset.

The area now occupied by the square was once the convent's gardens and orchard. In the mid-18th century, François Bonamy enlisted the help of "Frère Louis" to plant exotic and rare plants received from other cities and abroad in the Capuchin convent garden, as the apothecaries’ garden was vulnerable to theft and exposure.

Beginning in 1777, under the guidance of Jean-Joseph-Louis Graslin, a new neighborhood began to take shape. The development of Place de la Comédie was hindered by complex negotiations with the Capuchins, who had to agree to cede part of their land. In 1791, the convent was declared national property, and the city of Nantes purchased the land. The square was designed by Nantes architect Mathurin Crucy, who established the construction standards. The land was sold in parcels, with the first transaction, involving the former convent chapel, occurring in 1792.

Construction of the building at the corner with Rue Piron was facilitated by a loan of 20,000 francs from the renowned general of the Empire Pierre Cambronne.

The statue of Pierre Cambronne, created by Jean Debay and placed on a base designed by Henri-Théodore Driollet, was inaugurated on July 28, 1848.

In 1890, a bandstand was built near the Cambronne statue (on its eastern side) to host concerts by the municipal theater orchestras four nights a week. Every Thursday, the military bands of the garrison also gave free concerts. This wooden bandstand was dismantled in 1909. In 1954, the city council considered building a new concrete bandstand, but the project was eventually abandoned.

== Depiction in media ==
- Cours Cambronne appears in a scene from the 2017 film Cessez-le-feu directed by Emmanuel Courcol.
- Photographer Patrick Garçon exhibited his series Nantes, Cité des Artistes here in 2023 and 2024.

== See also ==
- List of city squares
- Place Royale, Nantes
