= Place Royale, Nantes =

Public square in Nantes, France

Place Royale
- Square
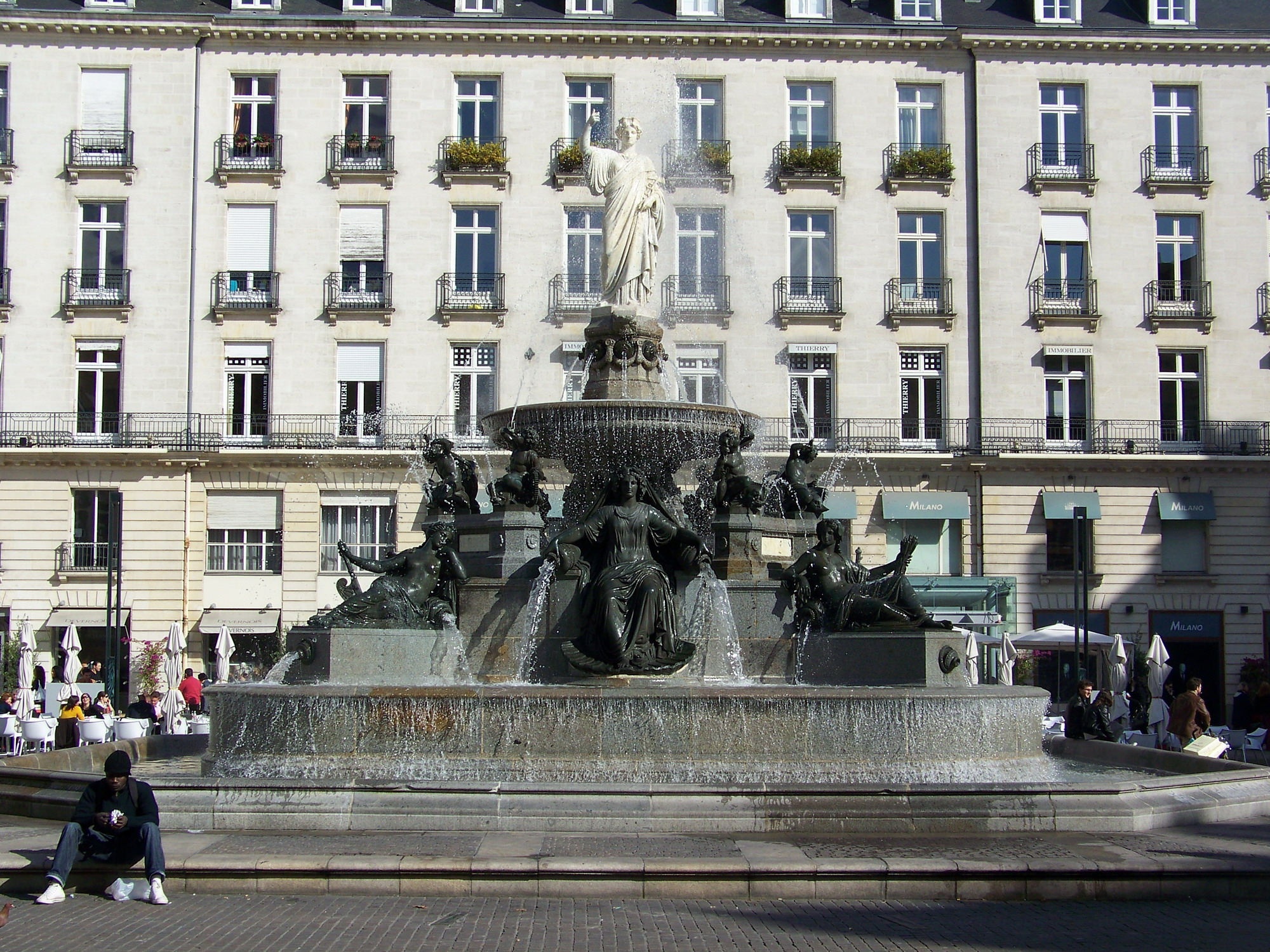
- The fountain at the center of Place Royale

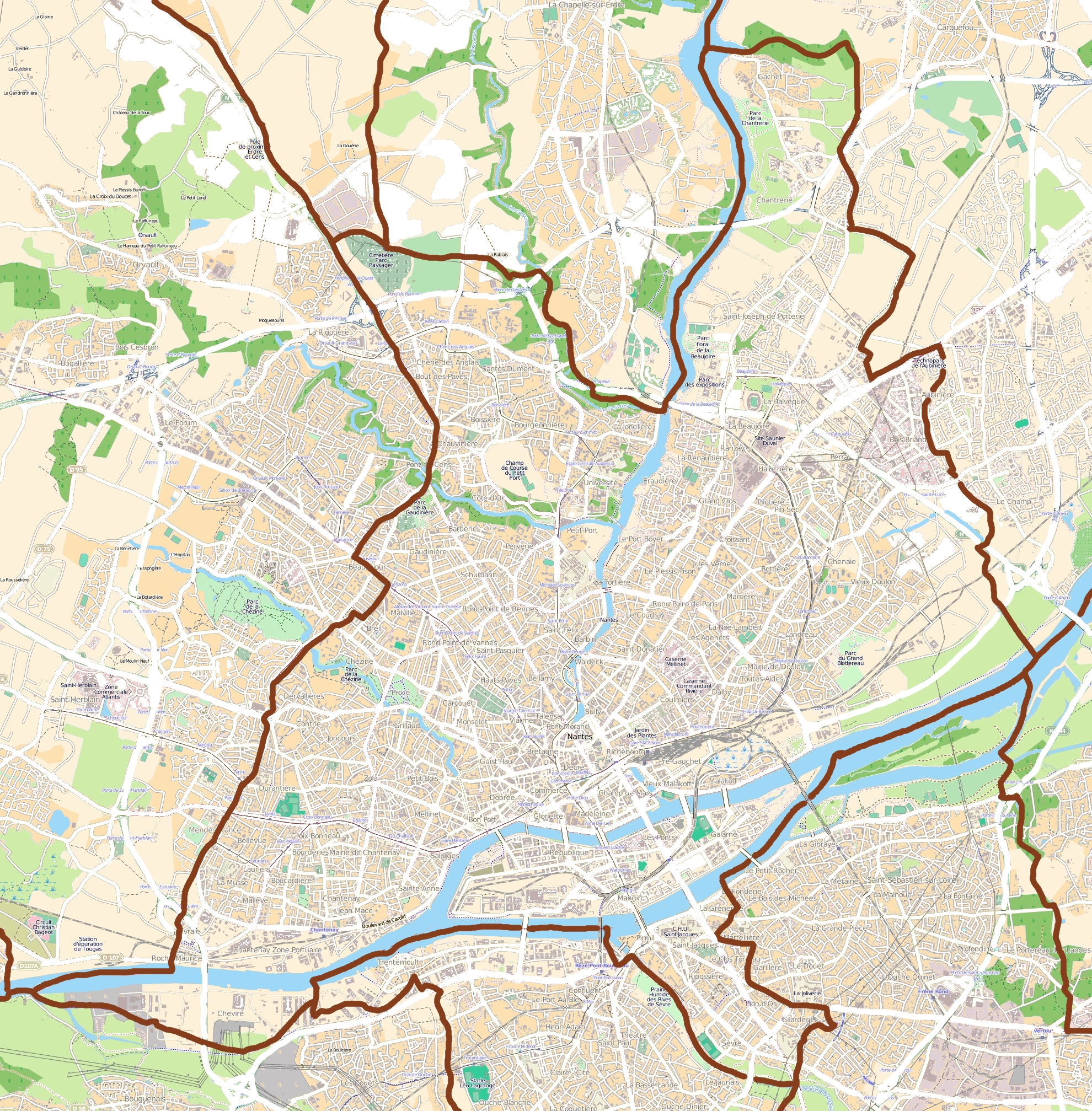
- Location in Nantes Place Royale (Pays de la Loire) Place Royale (France)
- Coordinates: 47°12′52.24″N 1°33′30.00″W
- Country: France
- Region: Pays de la Loire
- City: Nantes
- Quarter: City centre
- Established: 1790
- Time zone: UTC+1 (CET)
  - Summer (DST): UTC+2 (CEST)

Place Royale is a historic square in the city centre of Nantes, France. Designed in 1786 by local architect Mathurin Crucy, it was constructed in 1790 after the demolition of the medieval ramparts. The square forms the centerpiece of a cohesive neoclassical architectural ensemble built for the occasion. At its heart is a monumental fountain, inaugurated in 1865.

Dedicated to commerce from its inception, Place Royale has hosted notable emporia that remain significant in local memory and continues to serve a mercantile purpose in the 21st century. Unlike other royal plazas in France, the square has never featured a monarch’s statue, despite its name. It holds symbolic importance in Nantes and is a popular venue for artistic, festive, and political gatherings.

Severely damaged during World War II, the square was meticulously restored between 1945 and 1961. Over time, it became a roundabout for motor vehicles, but a renovation from 2007 to 2011 integrated it into the pedestrian zone of Nantes’ city center.

== Architecture ==
=== The square ===
Mathurin Crucy, who also designed Place Graslin, connected it to Place Royale via Rue Crébillon.

For Place Royale, Crucy adhered to neoclassical principles, emphasizing symmetrical façades, a rigorous layout, and open perspectives. The square’s distinctive shape combines a rectangular eastern section with a hemispherical western section, resembling a "toilet mirror" design. It is oriented along an east-west axis, slightly offset toward the southwest-northeast. A central fountain, a symbol of Nantes, is located in the rectangular section.

Paved entirely with granite blocks, Place Royale is served by nine streets: the Rue Crébillon, Rue de la Fosse, Rue de Gorges, Rue La Pérouse, Rue d'Orléans, Rue d'Orléans, Rue de l'Arche-Sèche, Rue Saint-Julien, and Rue des Vieilles-Douves. The square is situated at one of the lowest elevations in the city.

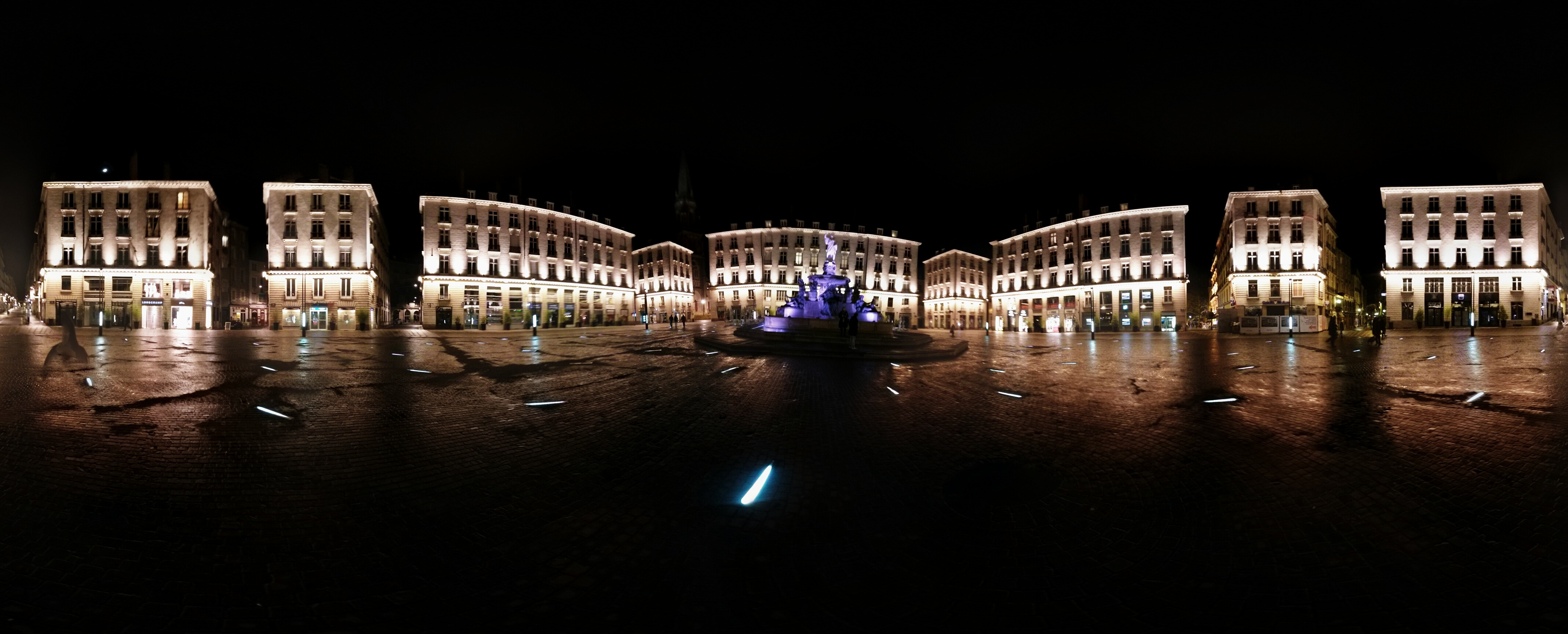
Panoramic view from the west, at the level of the Rue Crébillon (2013)

=== The fountain ===
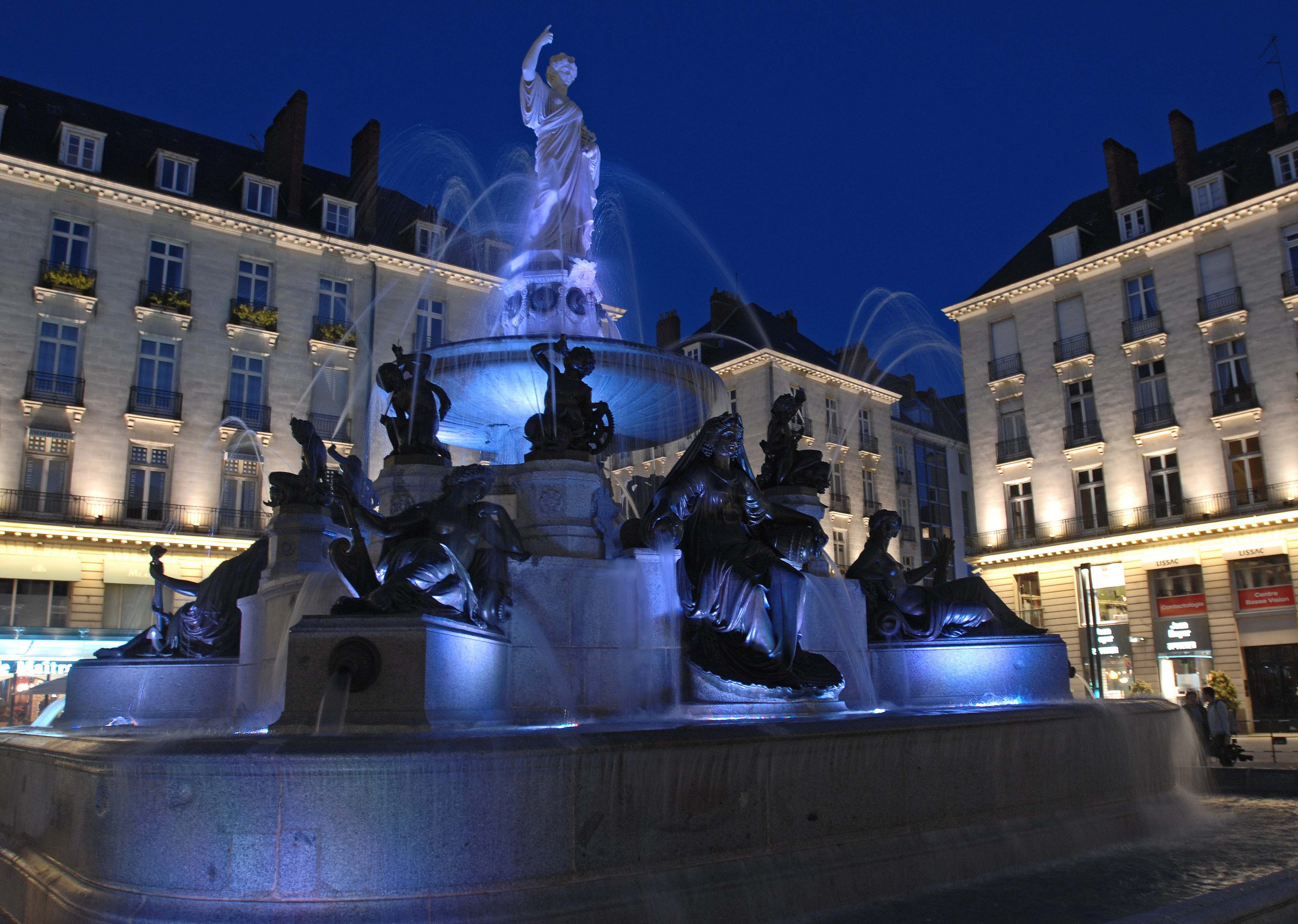
The Place Royale fountain at night (April 2007).

Inaugurated in 1865, the monumental fountain, designed by Nantes’ architect-voyer Henri-Théodore Driollet, symbolizes the city’s riverine and maritime heritage. Its pyramidal structure features three superimposed granite basins, with the lowest forming a square.

An allegorical white marble statue, depicting Nantes as a crowned woman holding a trident, stands atop a pedestal above a circular basin, facing Rue Crébillon. This statue, distinct from the bronze figures below, overlooks a series of allegorical statues representing the Loire River and its tributaries.

The Loire is represented by a woman, seated in the same direction as the statue of Nantes, pouring water from two amphorae. Its affluents are symbolized by three female statues and one male statue, half-reclining and pouring water from an amphora: the Erdre, the Sèvre, the Cher, and the Loiret. Other statues symbolize the eight genii of industry and commerce: blowing water through seashells and perched on dolphins spouting water from their nostrils, they recall the major role of the Port of Nantes in the city's economy.

The statues were crafted by the sculptors Daniel Ducommun du Locle (for the city and waterways) and Guillaume Grootaërs (for the genii), as well as the Nantes foundryman Jean-Simon Voruz, creator of the staircase of the Passage Pommeraye.

Fountain of Place Royale (2008)

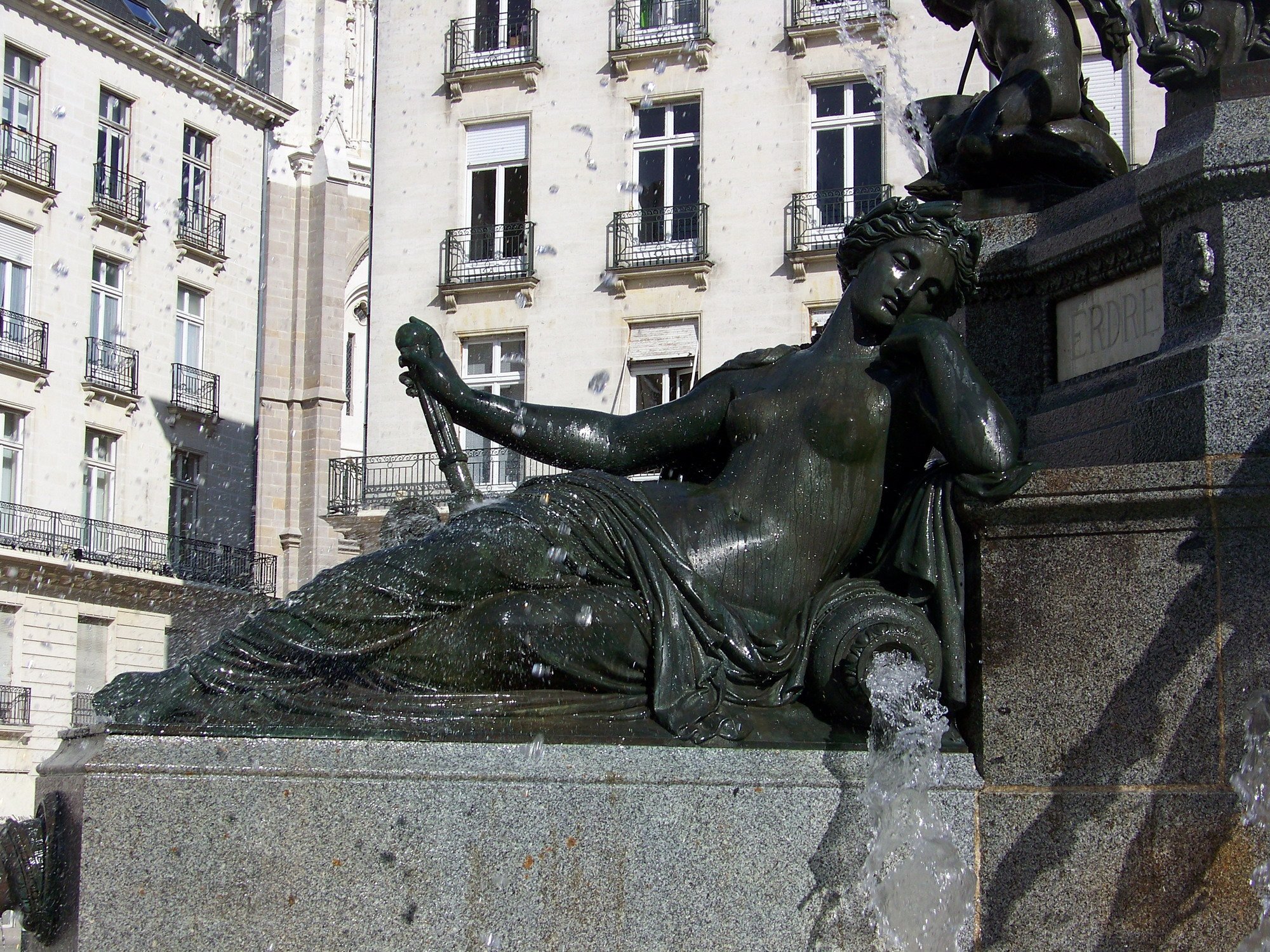
The Erdre

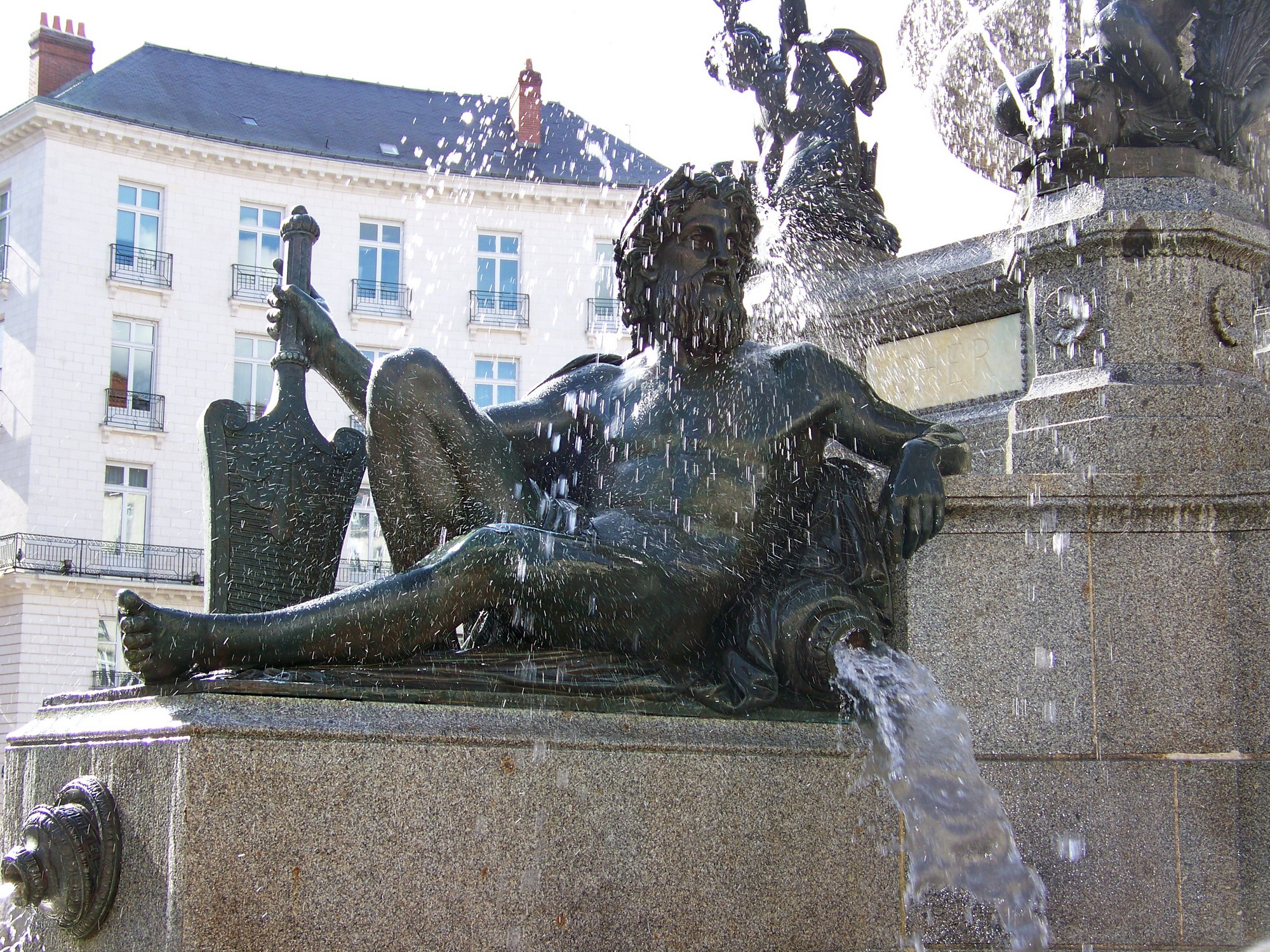
The Cher

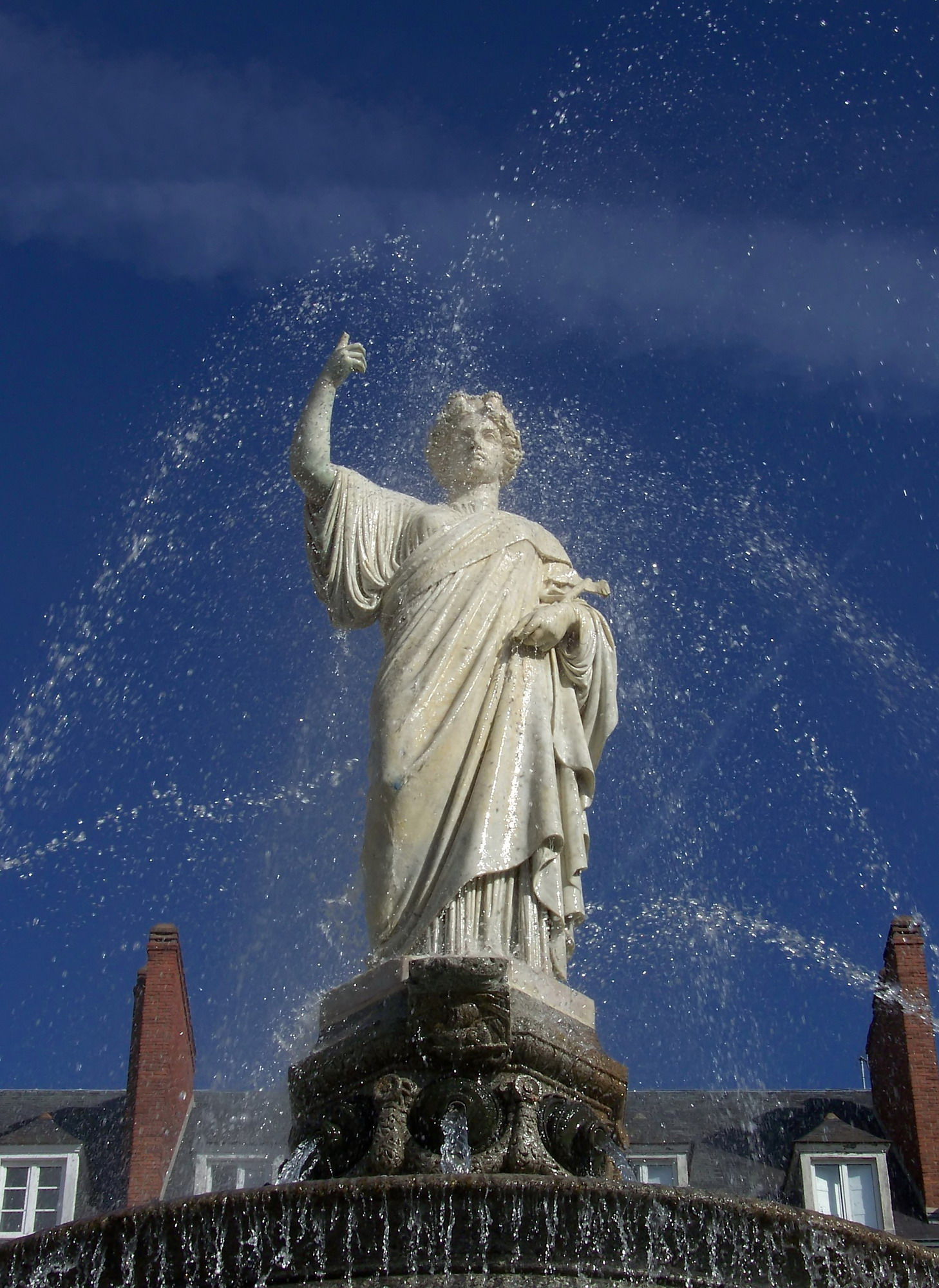
Nantes

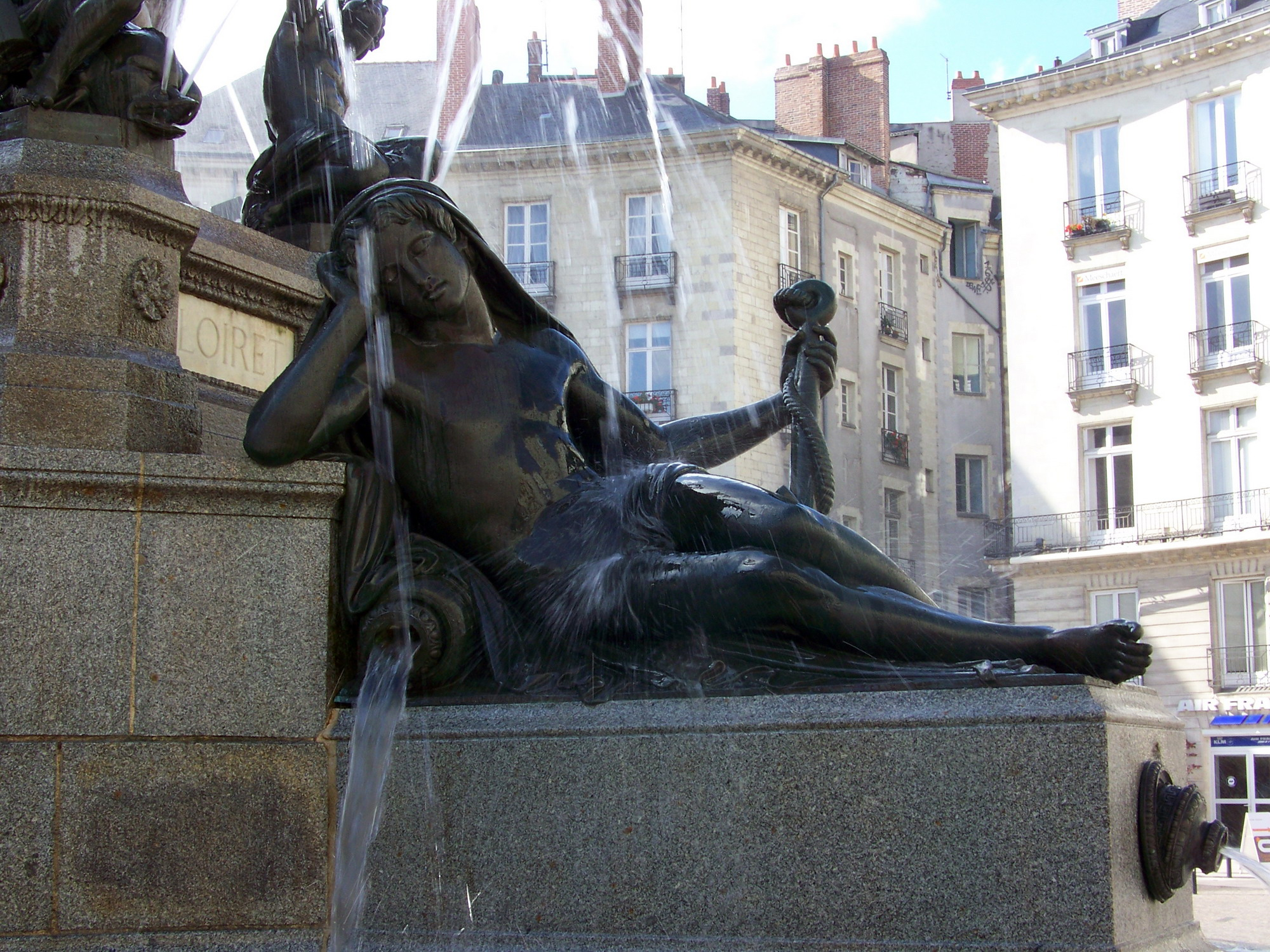
The Loiret

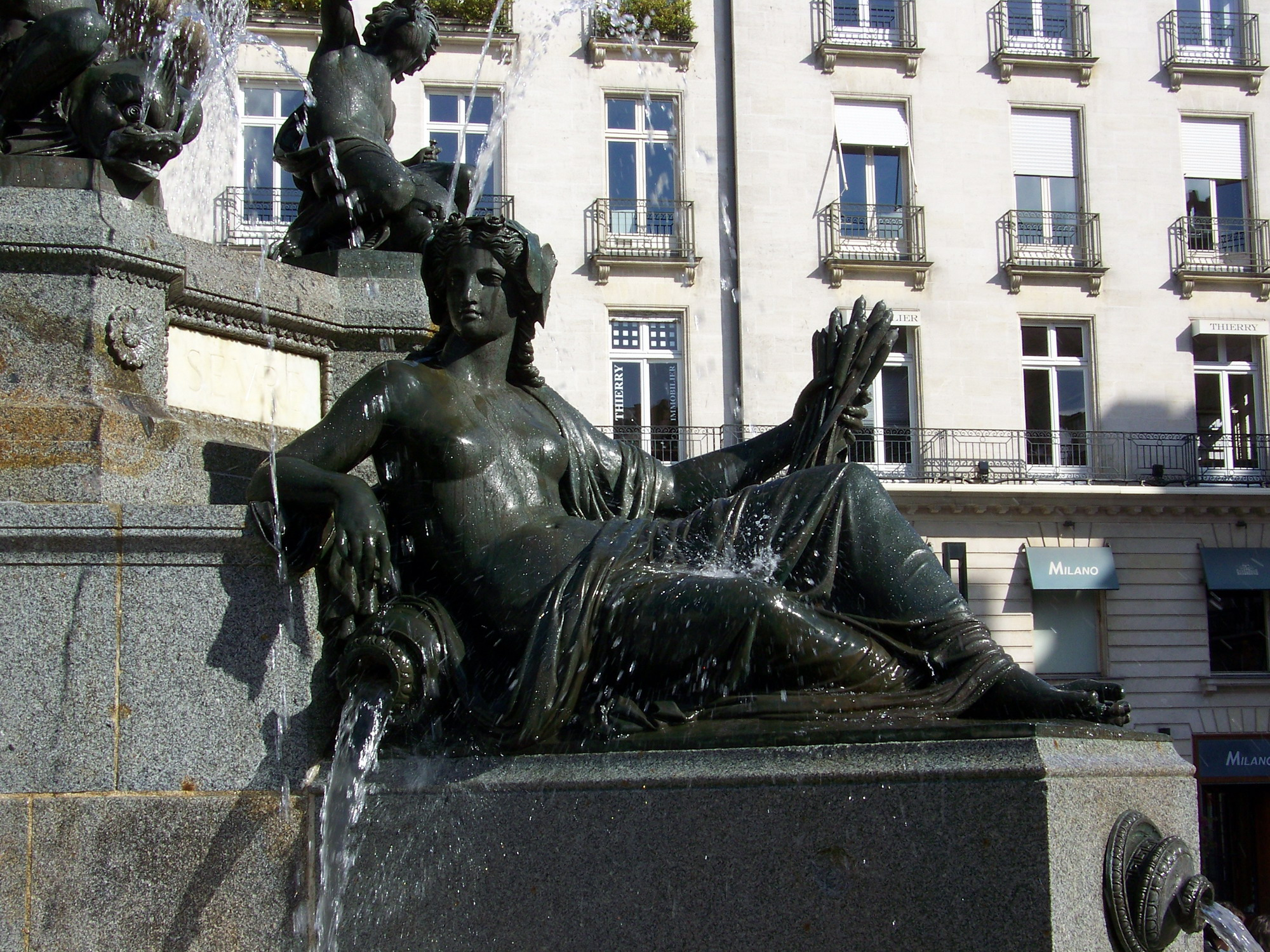
The Sèvre

== History ==
=== Before 1790 ===
The site of Place Royale was originally occupied by a fortified bastion, known as a "belouart," constructed around 1500 to protect the "Porte Saint-Nicolas," a gateway in the city’s medieval walls built under Peter I and rebuilt in 1444. The architect Pierre Vigné de Vigny was the first to propose a project for laying out a square at this location. His plan, which remained at the project stage, envisaged an esplanade covering the fortification. This bastion, surrounded by moats, was demolished in 1773 to facilitate the implementation of the urban planning plan proposed in 1766 and 1773 by Jean-Baptiste Ceineray, the city's architect-voyer. He proposed creating a large rectangular square in front of the new Basilica of Saint-Nicolas, intended to replace the existing one, which was too cramped, to expand the space available for the daily market. Around 1760, he seemed to have envisaged installing a theater hall and another for concerts to the south of the square, a project that did not come to fruition. In 1778, he proposed a new plan in which the square was a crossroads, without symmetry of buildings, with a statue of Louis XVI in the center.

On the Boulevard Saint-Nicolas, numerous shacks and stalls were built. In 1769 part of the land was given by Louis XVI to his new mistress, Madame du Barry. The level of Boulevard Saint-Nicolas was lowered, the old moats partially filled to provide access to the Place du Bon-Pasteur, something the inhabitants complained about, arguing that it facilitated access for criminals. In 1784, negotiations lead to the cession of Madame du Barry's lands to the city of Nantes, against the payment of a very large sum. The city also acquired the possessions of Jean-Joseph-Louis Graslin in 1789. The municipality then launched an ambitious urban planning program.

=== Layout of the quarter by Crucy ===
The city of Nantes calls on Mathurin Crucy, who had just succeeded Ceineray, to draw up the plan for the quarter. Realized in 1786 from Ceineray's sketches, it laid the foundations for a major overhaul of this part of the city, articulated around a square. This one is rectangular to the east and in a semicircle to the west. The Rue des Vieilles-Douves and the Rue Saint-Julien were created to respect the symmetry with the openings of the Rue de la Fosse and Rue de Gorges. Around the square, the façades were uniform (ordonnanced architecture): the buildings had four floors, including a ground floor, a first floor whose openings opened onto a balcony, two floors with tall windows, and a slate roof pierced by dormers. This ordonnanced ensemble is characteristic of French royal squares.

Crucy's plan differed from Ceineray's projects, the layout of the Graslin quarter leading to the reproduction of the rectangle associated with a semicircle adopted for the Place Graslin. The buildings were rental investments. The architect met the demand by creating buildings with austere façades. Functional, with a ground floor and mezzanine intended to house shops, they also respected social hierarchy: the openings of the top floor, intended for the little genii, were smaller than those of the floors for well-off households.

The Porte Saint-Nicolas and its two towers were demolished in 1790. The planned works around the square were completed in 1794.

When the project was launched, the existing esplanade was called "Place Saint-Nicolas." In Crucy's project, the square was called "Place Louis XVI," a name it bore between 1789 and 1792. But the French Revolution rendered this designation obsolete. The place then took the names of Champ de la Liberté and Champ de l'Égalité, or Place de l'Égalité until 1806.

Under the First French Empire, it became Place Impériale. During the Restoration, it cannot regain its initial name: indeed, it was the Place d'Armes in the middle of which stands one of the rare statues of Louis XVI, which took the king's name. Between 1814, the Place Impériale was renamed Place Royale. The Revolution of 1848 led to a new change, the Place de l'Égalité was again in the spirit of the times in 1849. Finally, in 1852, the Place Royale took its definitive name. However, it has never housed a statue of a monarch, which distinguishes it from other Place Royale in France.

=== Construction of the fountain ===
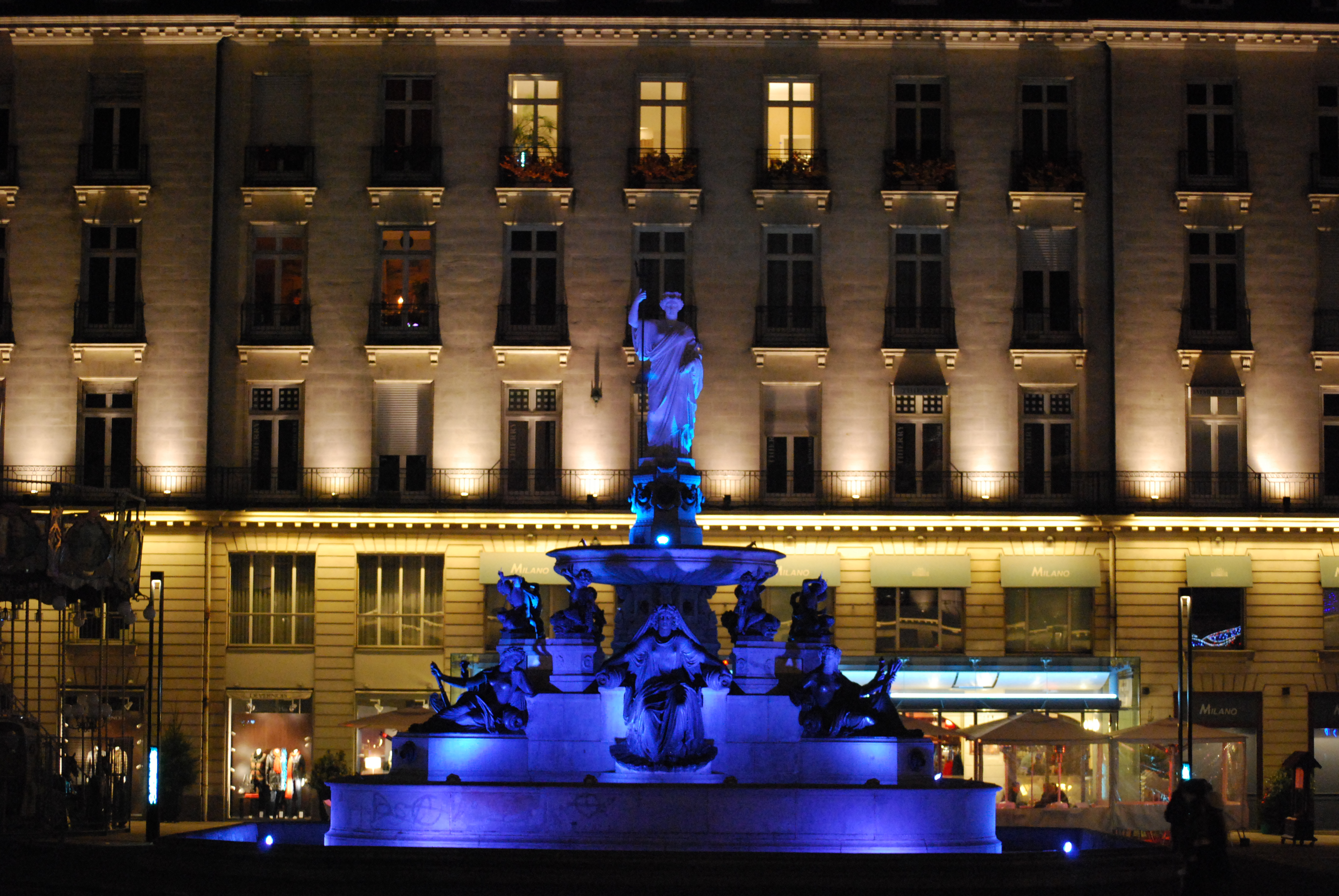
Place Royale at night (LED lighting) in 2009.

==== Absence of a monumental fountain in Nantes ====
In 1567 a certain Cardin Vallence, a fountaineer from Tours, exchanged with the Nantes town hall regarding the construction of a public fountain, which is the oldest project of this type for the city for which a written trace exists. But, engaged for works at the Château de Chenonceau, Cardin Vallence gave up and the project was not realized. Others followed, concerning several locations, but without result, and at the end of the 18th century there was no monumental fountain in Nantes.

==== First projects ====
After the earthworks of Place Royale, the problem of its layout arose. The municipal council of 3 October 1791 evoked the need to clear "the stones piled up there from the demolition of the cavalier (fortified bastion) that existed on this square." Mathurin Crucy proposed, to meet the needs of the army, the creation of a guardhouse, and also sketched a fountain: a draped female statue in the antique style appears in a niche reprising the rectangle/semicircle scheme, vertical this time. A vote ratified the decision to build a national guard corps and a fountain in replacement of the well previously located on the parvis of the nearby Basilica of Saint-Nicolas, today named Félix-Fournier. The project is nevertheless abandoned. In March 1837, the city launched a call for tenders to which the engineer of the Ponts Auguste Jegou responded on 31 July 1837; his project for distributing Loire waters provided for the installation of 294 fountain-posts and monumental fountains in the Nantes squares and promenades. The project was not selected.

==== Henri Driollet's project ====
Details of the fountain

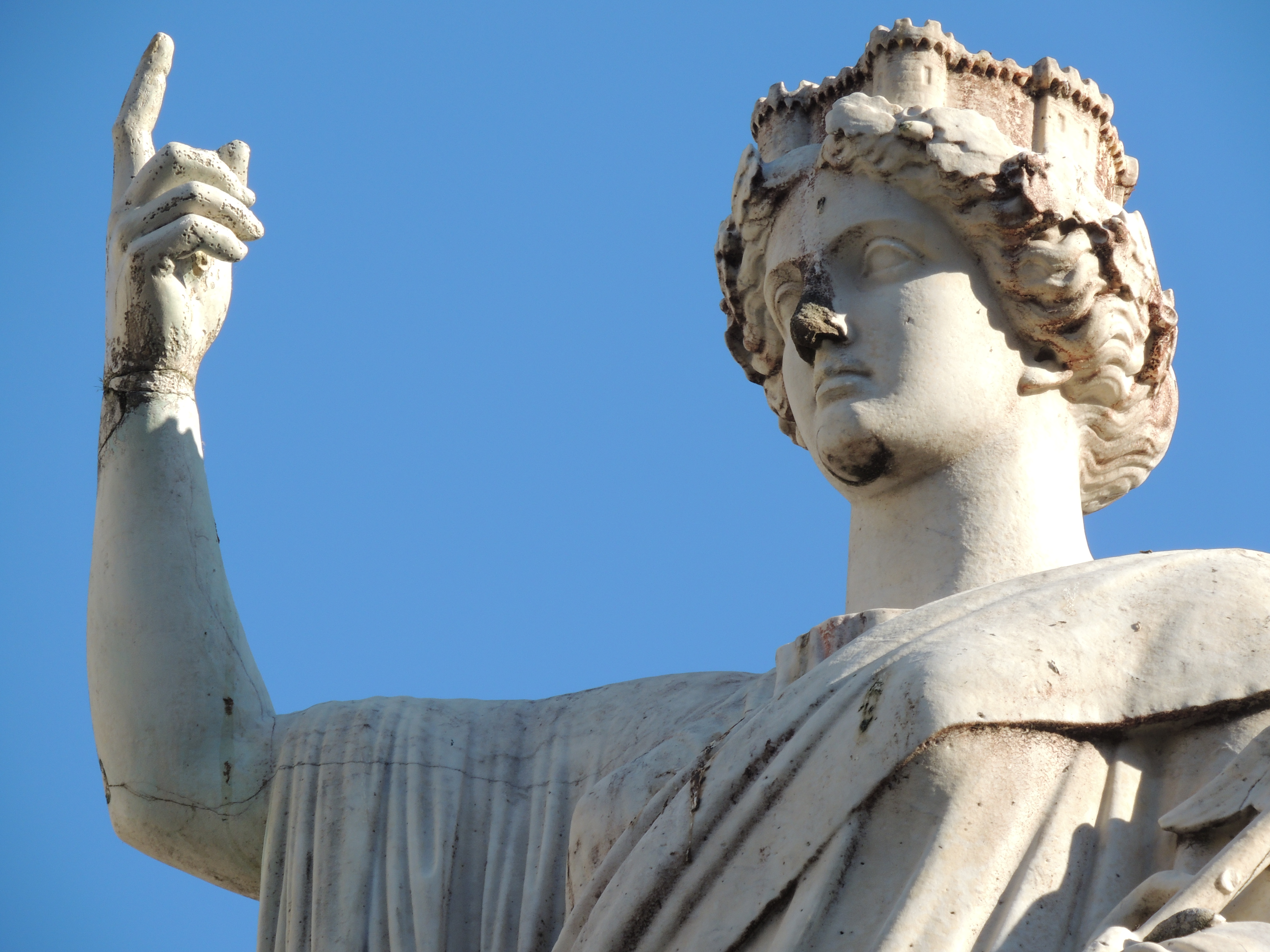
Head and arm of the statue representing Nantes.

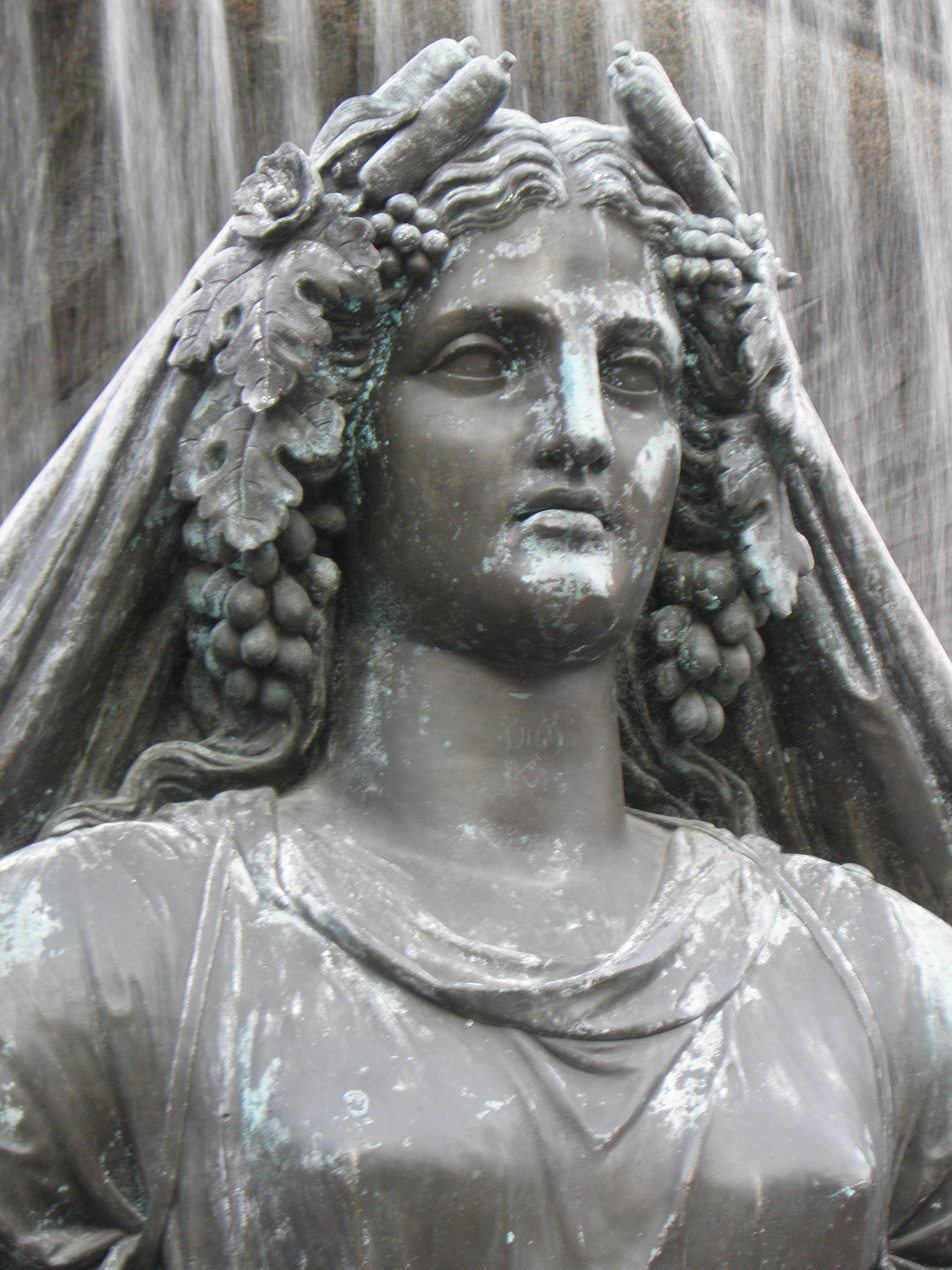
Head of the statue representing the Loire.

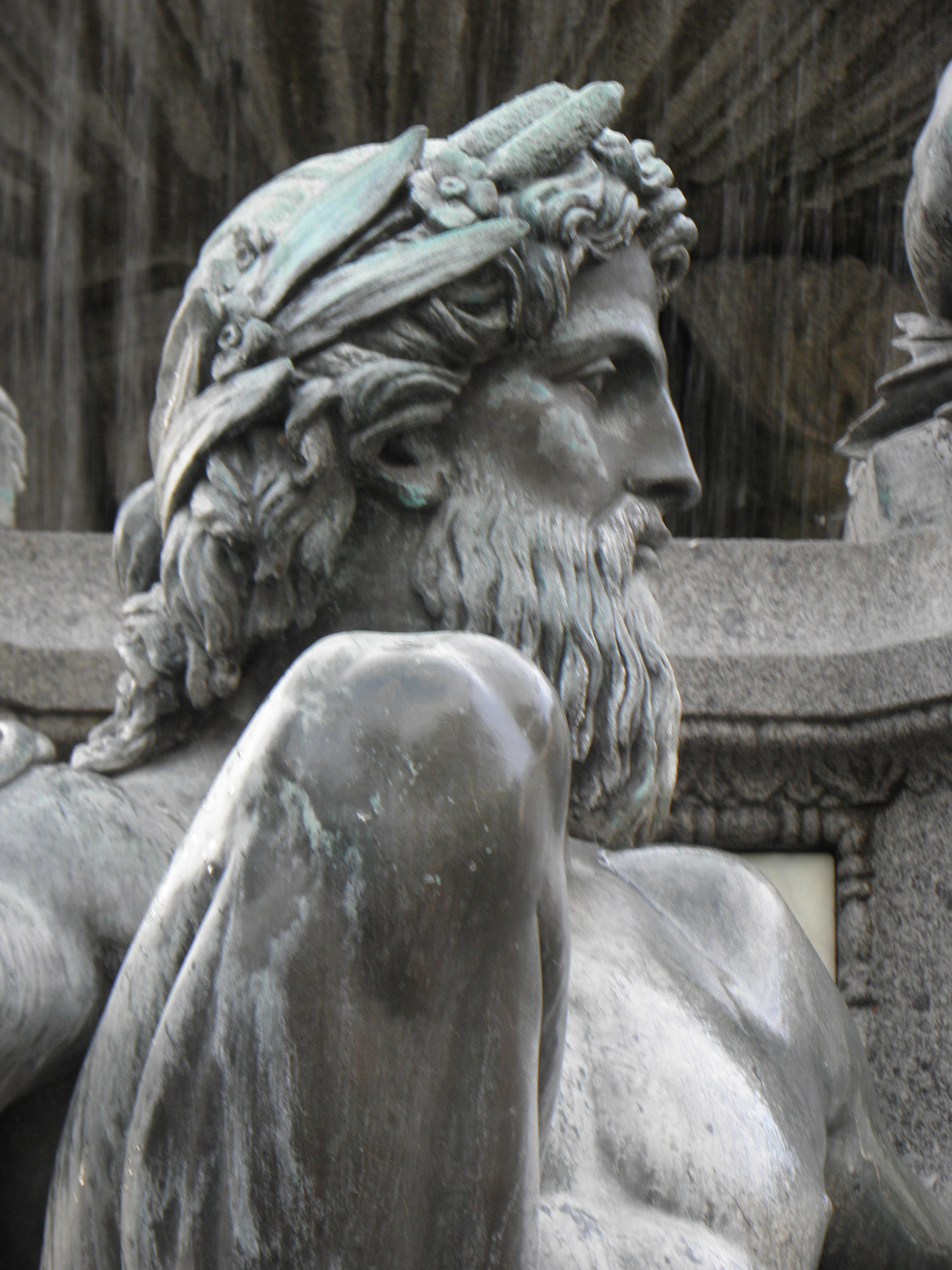
Head of the statue representing the Cher.

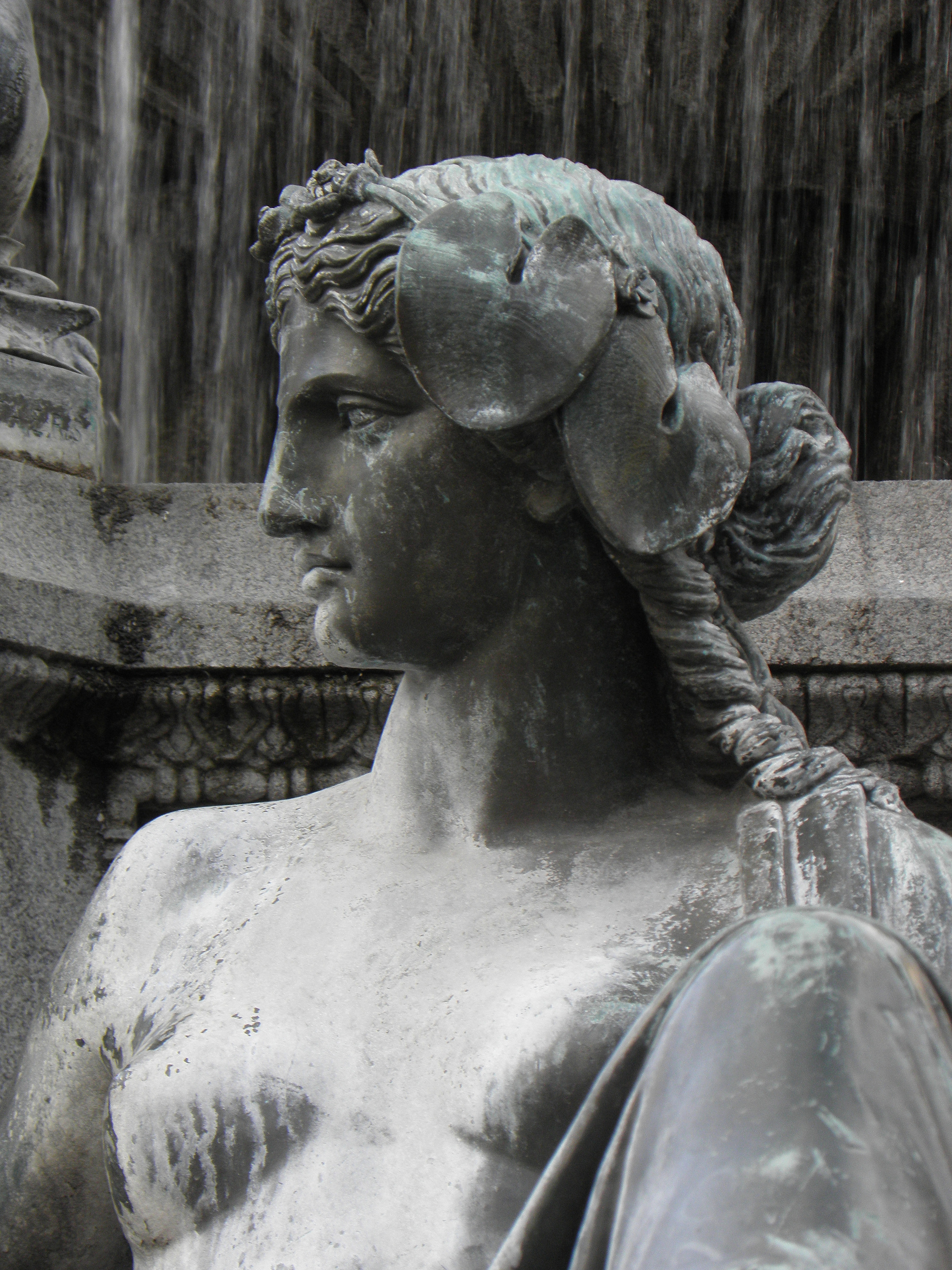
Head of the statue representing the Sèvre.

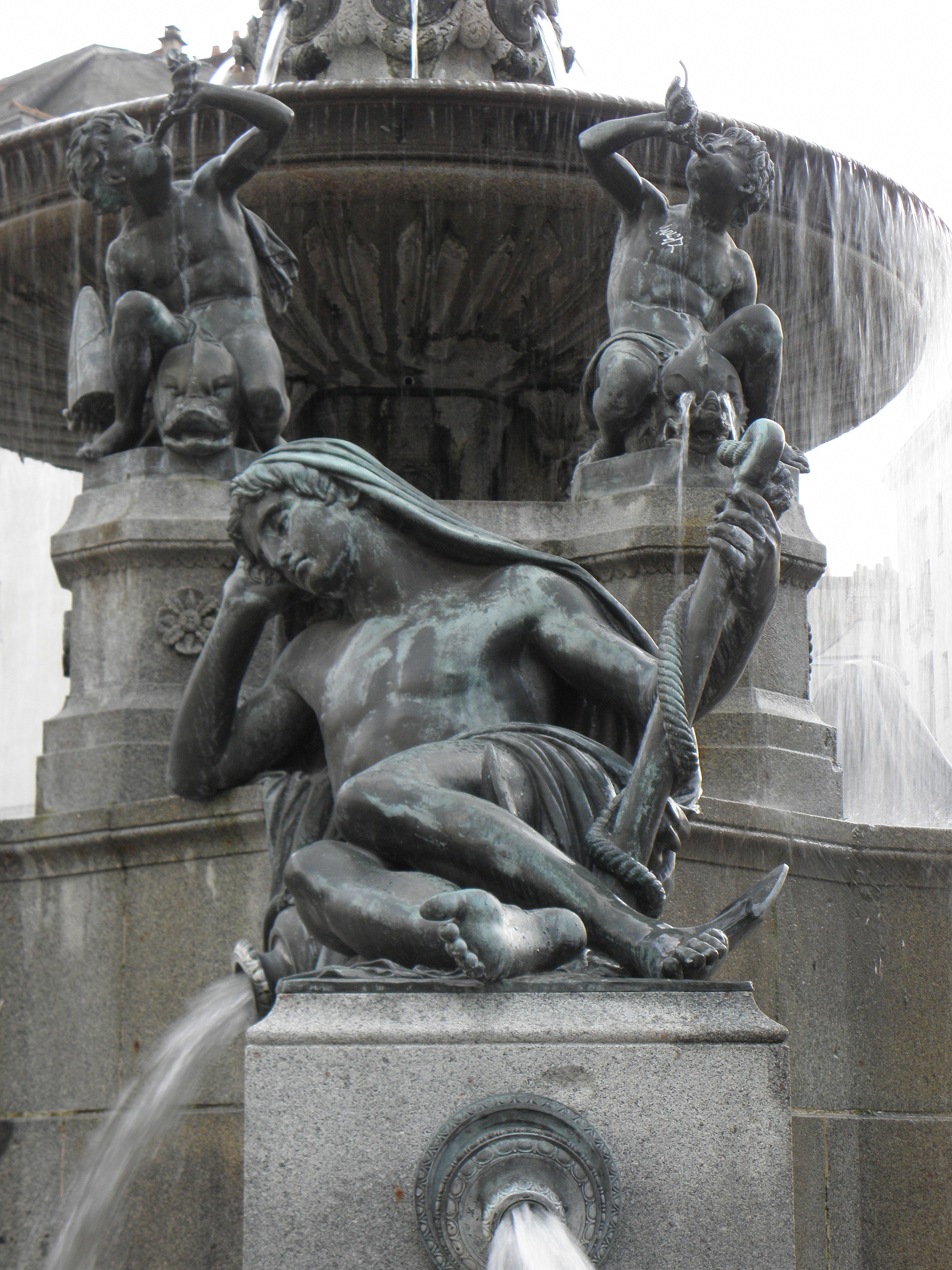
Statue representing the Loiret.

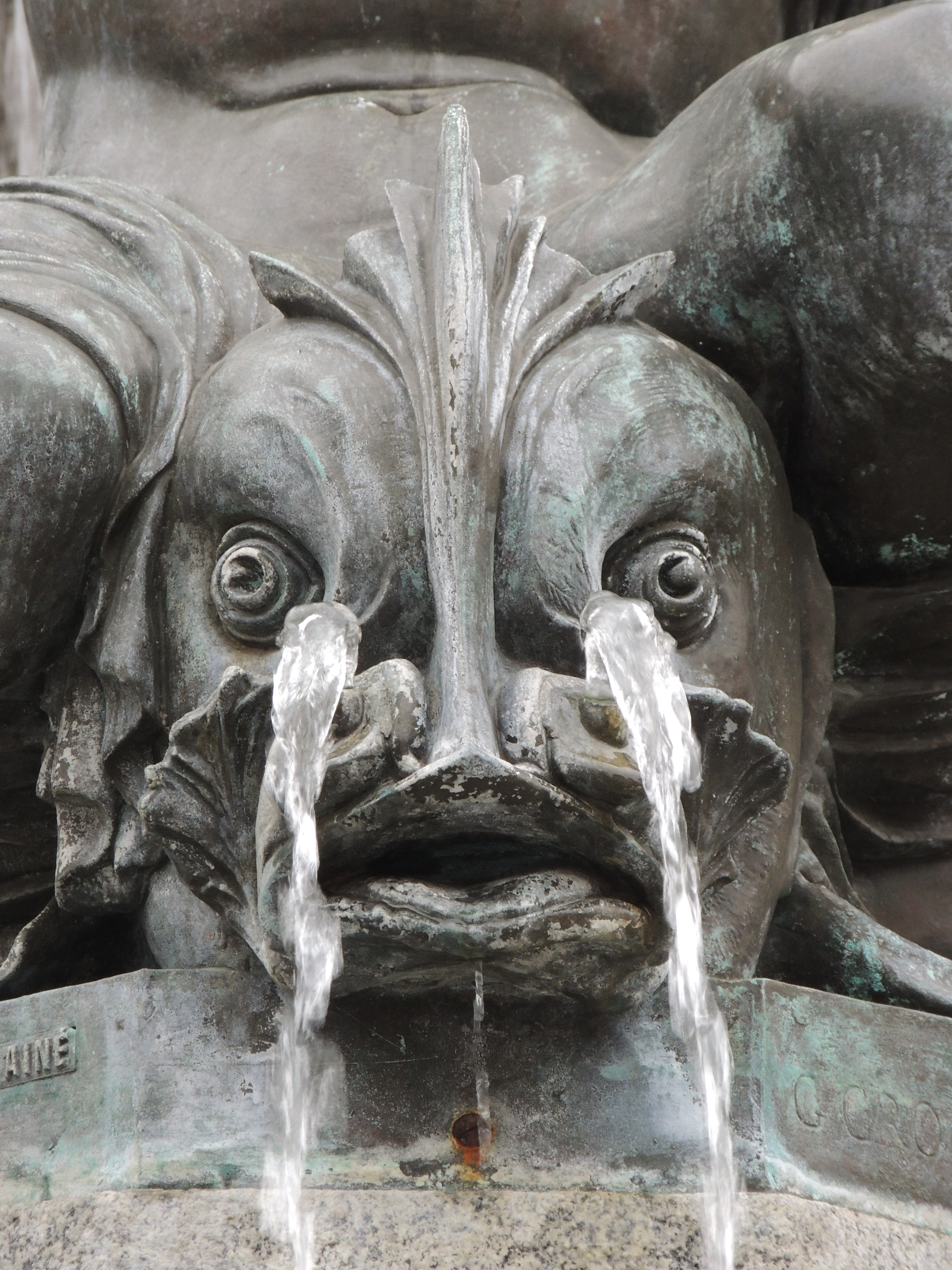
Stylized dolphin (sea monster).

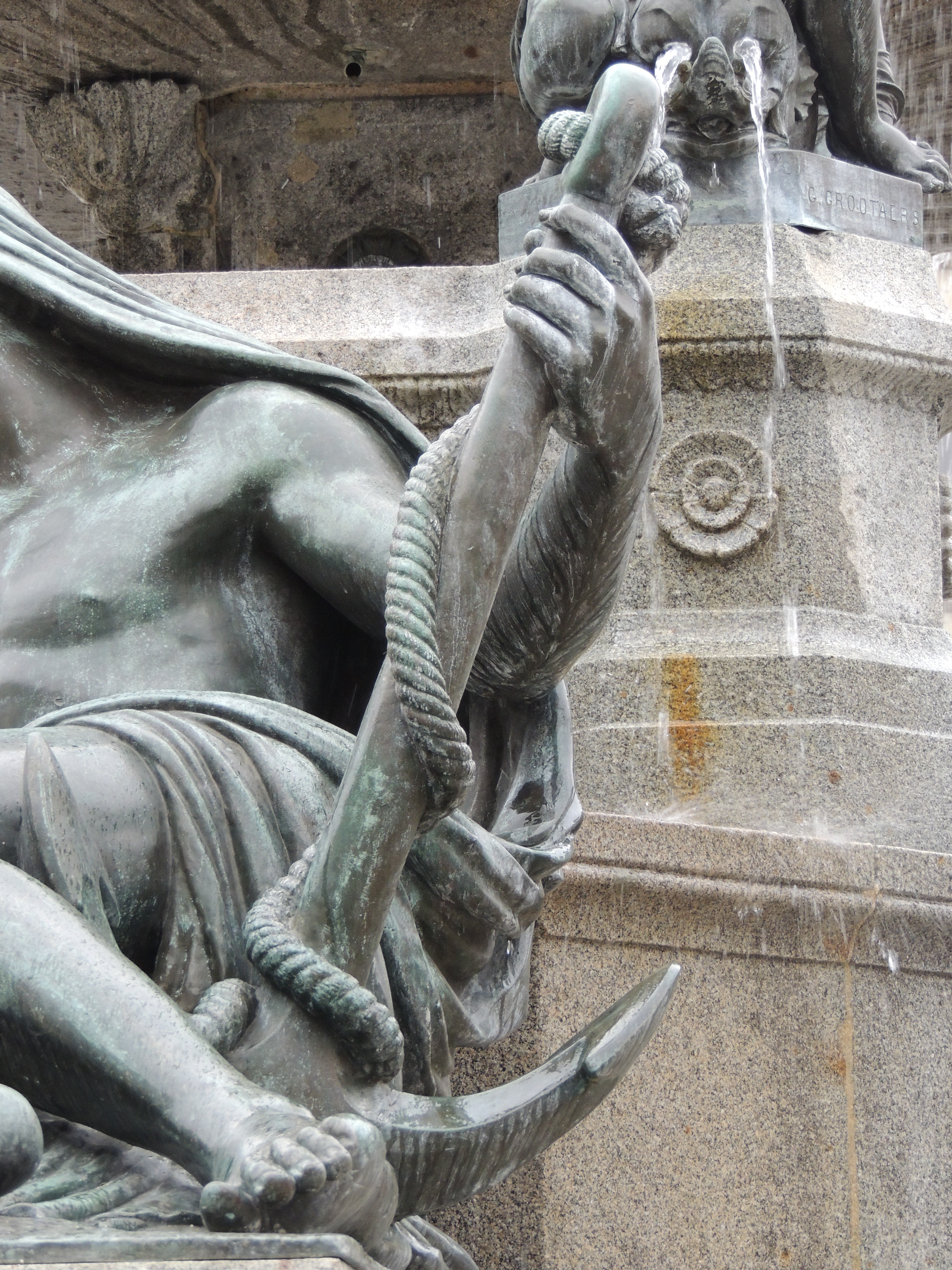
Symbolic attribute of the Loiret, a marine anchor.

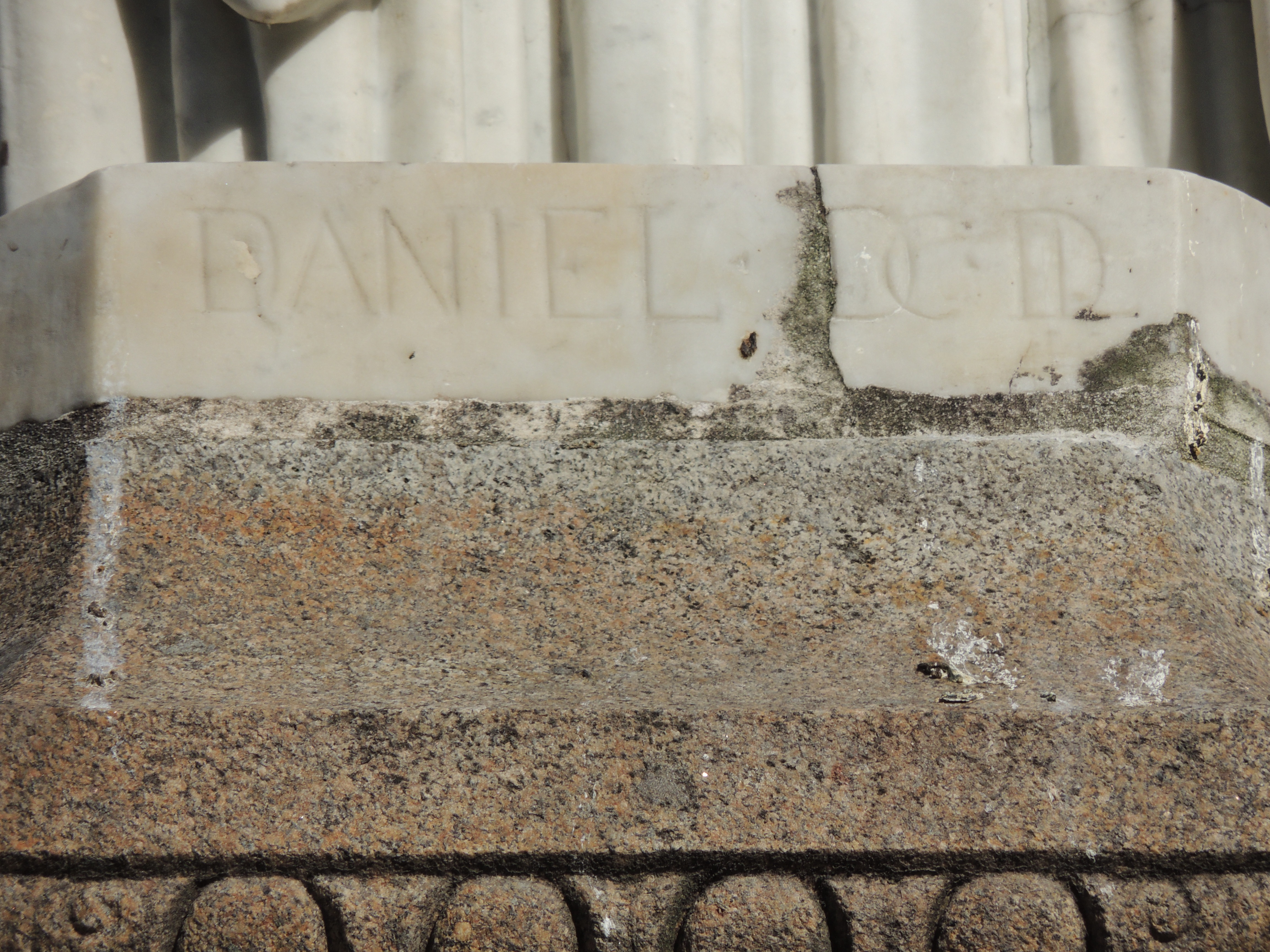
Signature of Daniel Ducommun du Locle on the base of the statue representing Nantes.

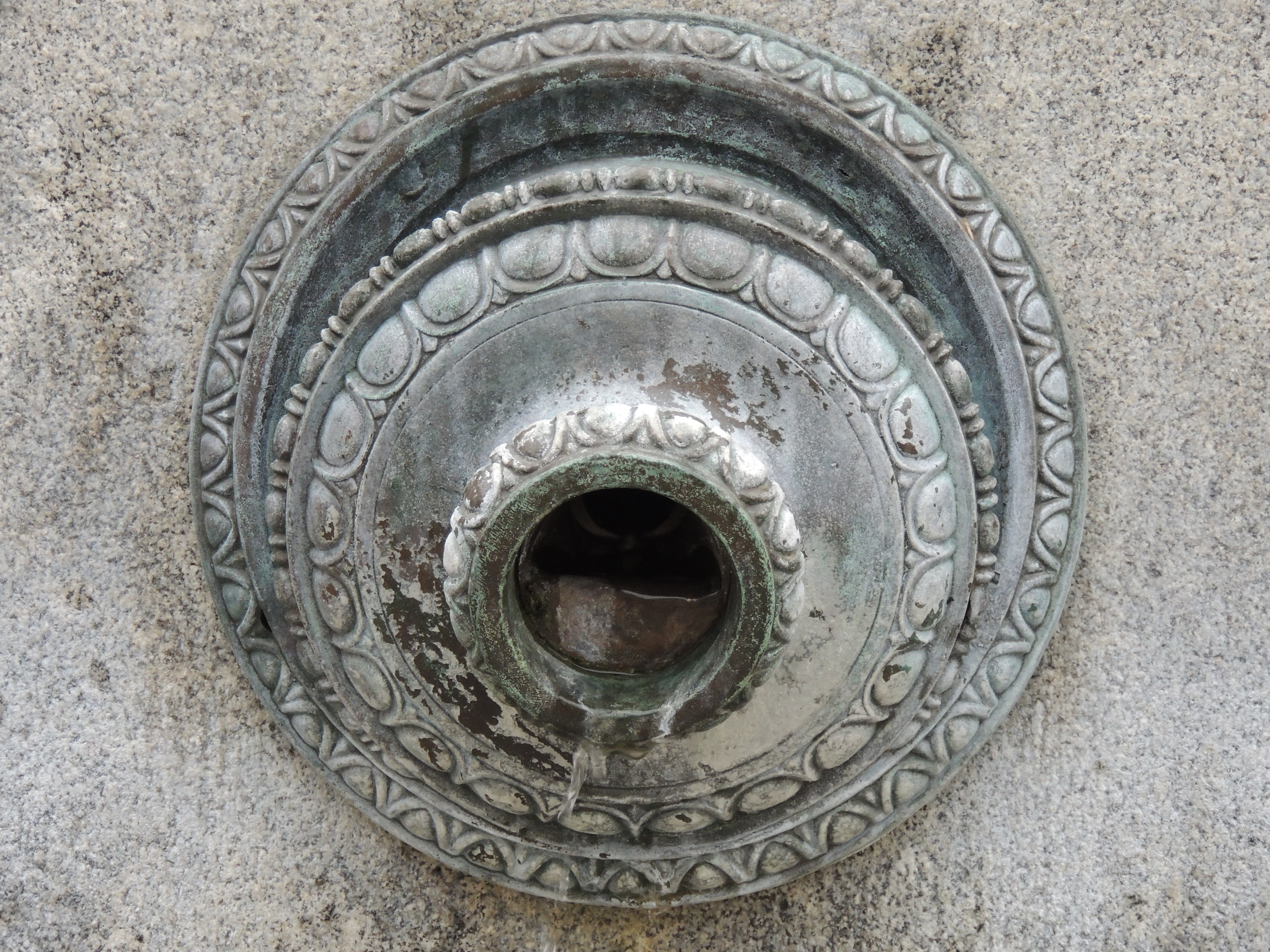
Spout between two basins.

===== First proposal =====
On 27 April 1849 Henri-Théodore Driollet, chief architect of the city, presented a project for a monumental fountain dominating a redesigned square. This square then bore the name "Place de l'Égalité." The plan provided for wide sidewalks adorned with stone benches around the square. He proposed to redo the leveling of the esplanade and endowed it with new paving. The centerpiece of the project was a monumental fountain in cast iron. Driollet paid particular attention to lighting since he planned "two rows of candelabra." This proposal was appreciated by the municipal council but faced a major obstacle: the absence of a water service to supply the fountain. The idea was therefore postponed.

===== Second proposal =====
Driollet then proposed to replace the fountain, a central layout consisting of flowering shrubs. The municipal council made modifications to the proposal, which the public works commission amended, suggesting the installation of a "large monumental candelabra combining twenty-four lanterns into a single beam of light." Presented in February 1851, this version was not accepted by the council.

===== Third proposal =====
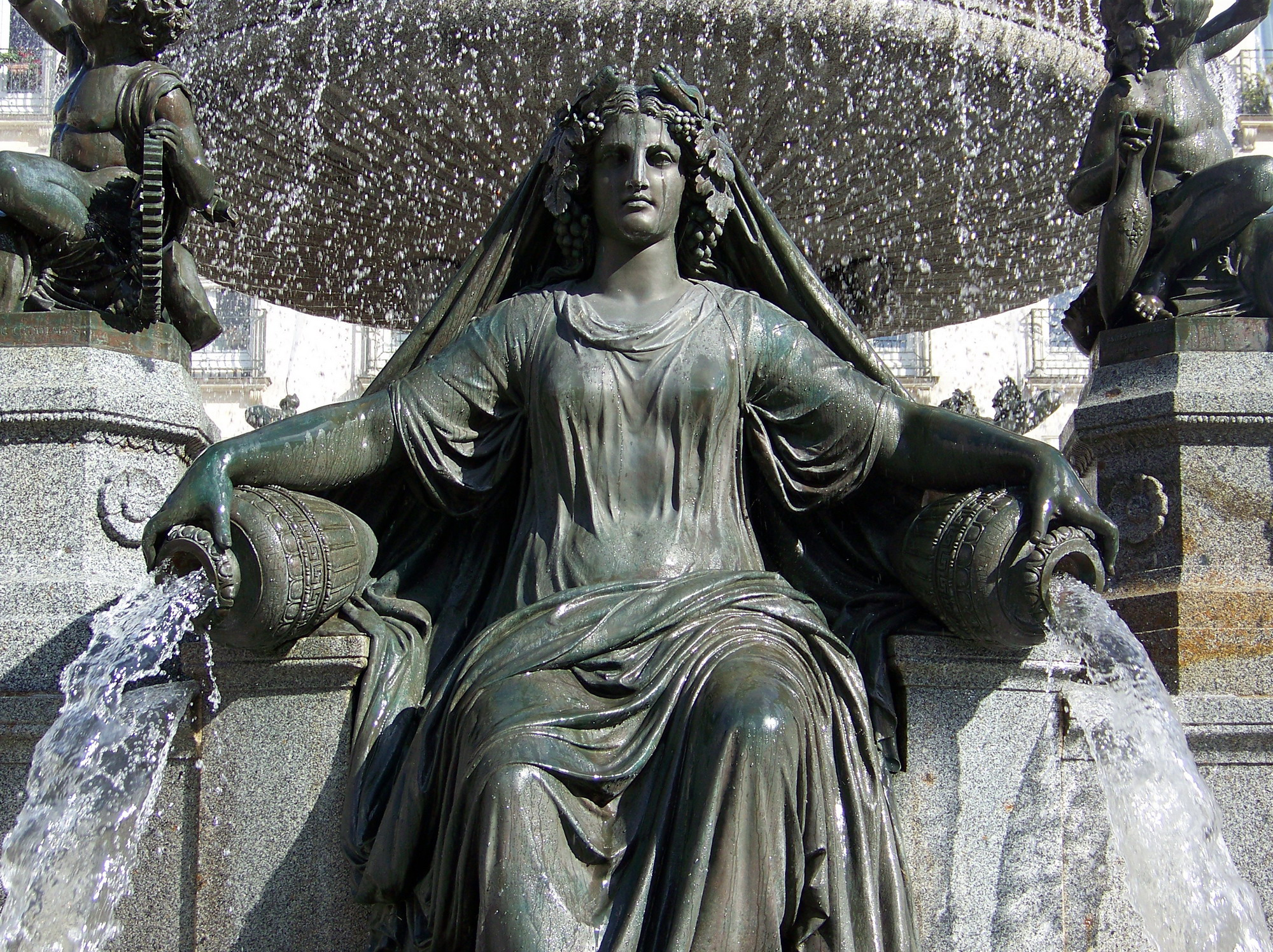
Allegorical statue of the Loire.

In 1852 Daniel Du Commun Du Locle associated with Henri Driollet to propose again a fountain adorned with statues. Around the one symbolizing Nantes, Driollet planned to install those of the Loire, the Erdre, and the Sèvre. These statues were nymphs each carrying an urn from which water escapes. Sculptures representing eight genii seated on dolphins throwing water symbolized the main industrial and commercial activities of Nantes.

===== Oppositions and modifications =====
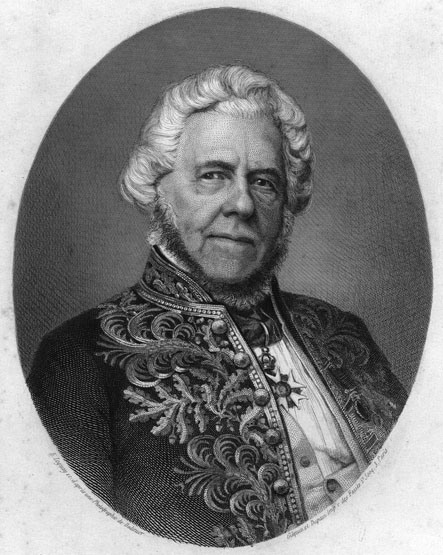
It was under the mayoralty of Ferdinand Favre that the fountain was conceived and built, which he inaugurated in 1865.

In 1854, Henri Driollet and the statuary Daniel Ducommun du Locle insisted that their project should be accepted. They began a long period of negotiations. On 24 March 1857, the departmental commission for civil buildings issued a generally favorable opinion. Only the statue representing the Loire was object of criticism. Some members of the commission proposed its outright suppression, or that it replaced the statue of Nantes deemed banal. All wished to see the statue less nude.

On 28 September 1859, it was the Bishop of Nantes, Mgr Jaquemet, who worried about the project which would contained "a monument contrary to the religious feelings of the population or to the rules of public morality." It was the mayor himself, Ferdinand Favre, who reassured him, certifying that he himself obtained from Daniel Ducommun du Locle that his statue represented a clothed woman.

===== Realization =====
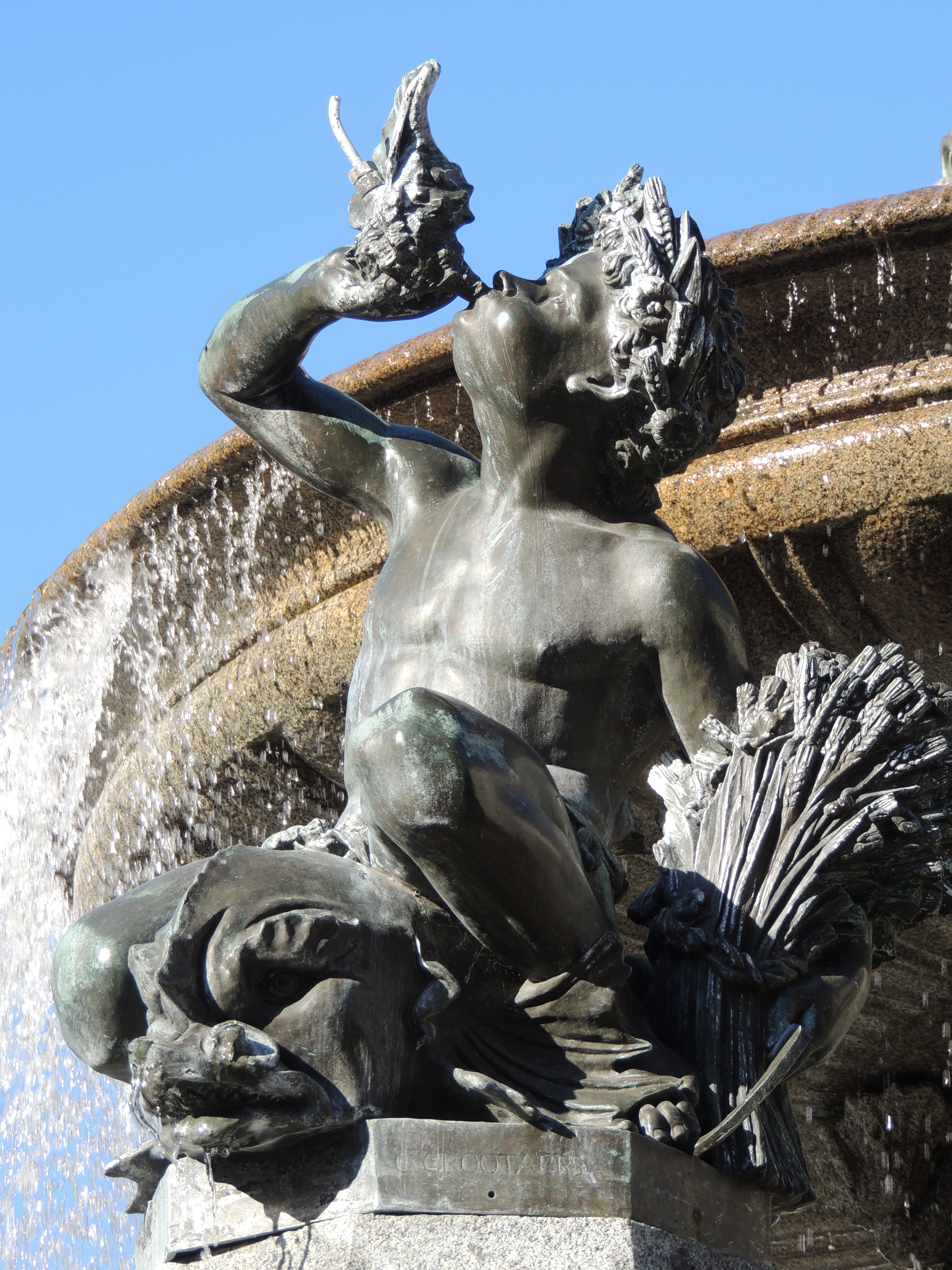
One of the eight genii of industry; the base bears the signature of Guillaume Grootaërs.

In 1861, the project took its definitive form. It provided that the statues were in bronze, and no longer in cast iron. The necessary blue granite for construction was transported from Cuguen (Ille-et-Vilaine). Weighing about 30 t (30 t), it was conveyed on a sled pulled by twenty horses. The basin was installed on 4 April 1861. The execution of the bronze statuary from the works of Daniel Ducommun du Locle and Guillaume Grootaërs was entrusted to the foundryman Jean-Simon Voruz, who cast them as they were created. Henri Driollet, the project's architect, died in 1863. In 1864, a fountain existed, surrounded by railings, but without statues. The definitive monument was inaugurated on 16 March 1865 by the senator-mayor Ferdinand Favre, who began his speech thus:

It is common in France to inaugurate a public fountain in the middle of a large population center. And yet, it is new for us who, in the heart of our old city, bathed by a great river and two rivers, inaugurate on one of our main squares our first monumental fountain

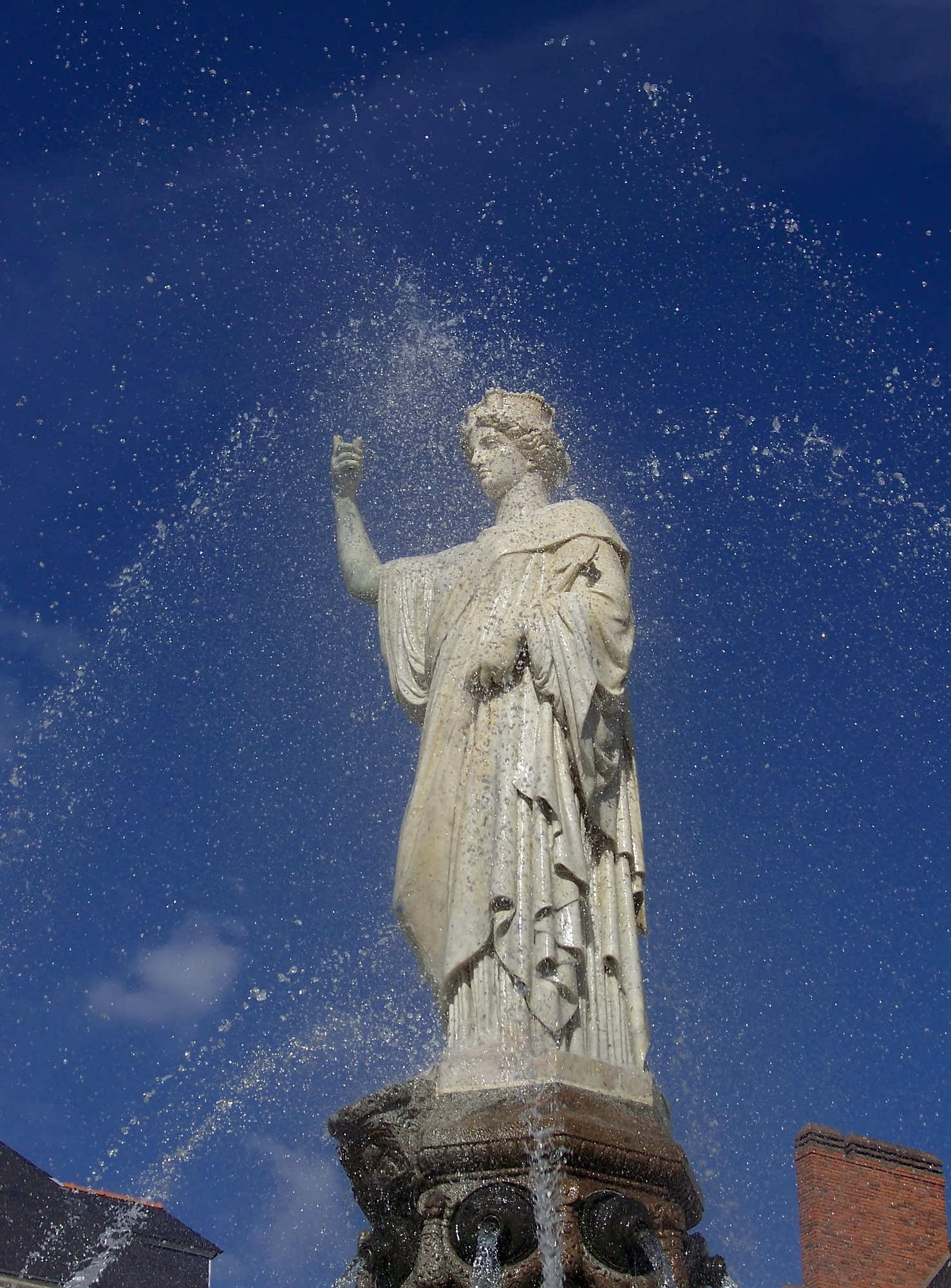
Allegorical statue of the city of Nantes at the top of the fountain

The press, notably Le Phare de la Loire, ironized on the excessive prudery of the work. The statue of the Loire was nicknamed "Mrs. Jacquemet", sarcasm directed at the bishop who had been moved by the supposedly indecent character of the initial project.

=== The role of the Revolution in World War II ===
On the French Revolution, a procession that paraded through the city arrived at the "Place Égalité," where a temporary Tree of Liberty had been erected for the occasion. The monument, erected thanks to a collection by the national guard, featured three statues, one of which represents "Égalité." A procession paraded under the arch. Among the emblems carried, pikes, borne by 98 citizens, bore the names of the 98 departments of France. The square was a symbolic place in the city. When Charette was captured during the War in the Vendée, the revolutionary authorities chose to exhibit the defeated man to the crowd. Brought to Nantes, the Vendéan general was forced to cross the city on foot, under armed escort, to go to his place of judgment. From la Fosse to the "Rue de la Casserie" (which became Rues Basse and Rue Haute-Casserie), the chosen route was not the shortest, but included the most recent and spacious arteries of the city: the Rue Jean-Jacques-Rousseau, the "Place Balanche" (now Place Graslin), the Rue Crébillon, and the "Place de l'Égalité."

The last building surrounding the esplanade was completed in 1845.

On 26 February 1848, the announcement of the Revolution was made by a "Democratic Commission" which included Georges Clemenceau, Ange Guépin, and Victor Mangin. An enthusiastic crowd gathered in Place Royale before setting off in demonstration through the streets of Nantes, then returning to Place Royale. The same year, the departure of the Poles from Nantes to fight for Polish independence was the occasion for a ceremony on the square on 11 April 1848. The Polish cause is very popular, especially in "progressive" circles and the labor movement. On the day of the ceremony, the workers came to acclaim the Polish patriots, and incidentally attended the inauguration of a "tree of Liberty," as in 1792.

At the beginning of the 20th century, modification of the appearance of the ground floor and mezzanine façades was authorized. The city's firefighters, who did not then have a barracks, gathered on the square on Sunday mornings before setting off on parade.

The start of the 6th and final stage of the first Tour de France in 1903 was given on the square, in front of the "Le Continental" brasserie.

=== Post-World War II restoration ===
The bombing of September 1943 devastated the esplanade (as well as the nearby Rue du Calvaire and Basilica of Saint-Nicolas), destroying eight of the nine buildings surrounding the square. It was decided after the war to rebuild it identically, under the direction of the chief architect Michel Roux-Spitz.

The buildings were rebuilt, this time in concrete, slightly set back from their former alignments. They included, however, some modifications such as the enlargement of windows and dormers, or access to the buildings, which now took place at the rear (the entrance to those located to the east of the square were made, for example, Rue Du Couëdic) to favor shops on the square side. This was done, the latter, endowed with wide sidewalks, was enlarged to facilitate traffic. But, considering the attachment of the Nantais to this monument, the municipality obtained from the "Regional Commission for War Damage" that it agreed to finance the refurbishment of the granite basin, while the restoration of the sculptural elements considered sumptuary remains the city's responsibility. The works were carried out in 1961.

In 1960, the square served as an exterior set for the film Lola (1961) by Jacques Demy.

Temporarily renamed "Place du Peuple" in May 68, Place Royale was associated with all social movements and major events.

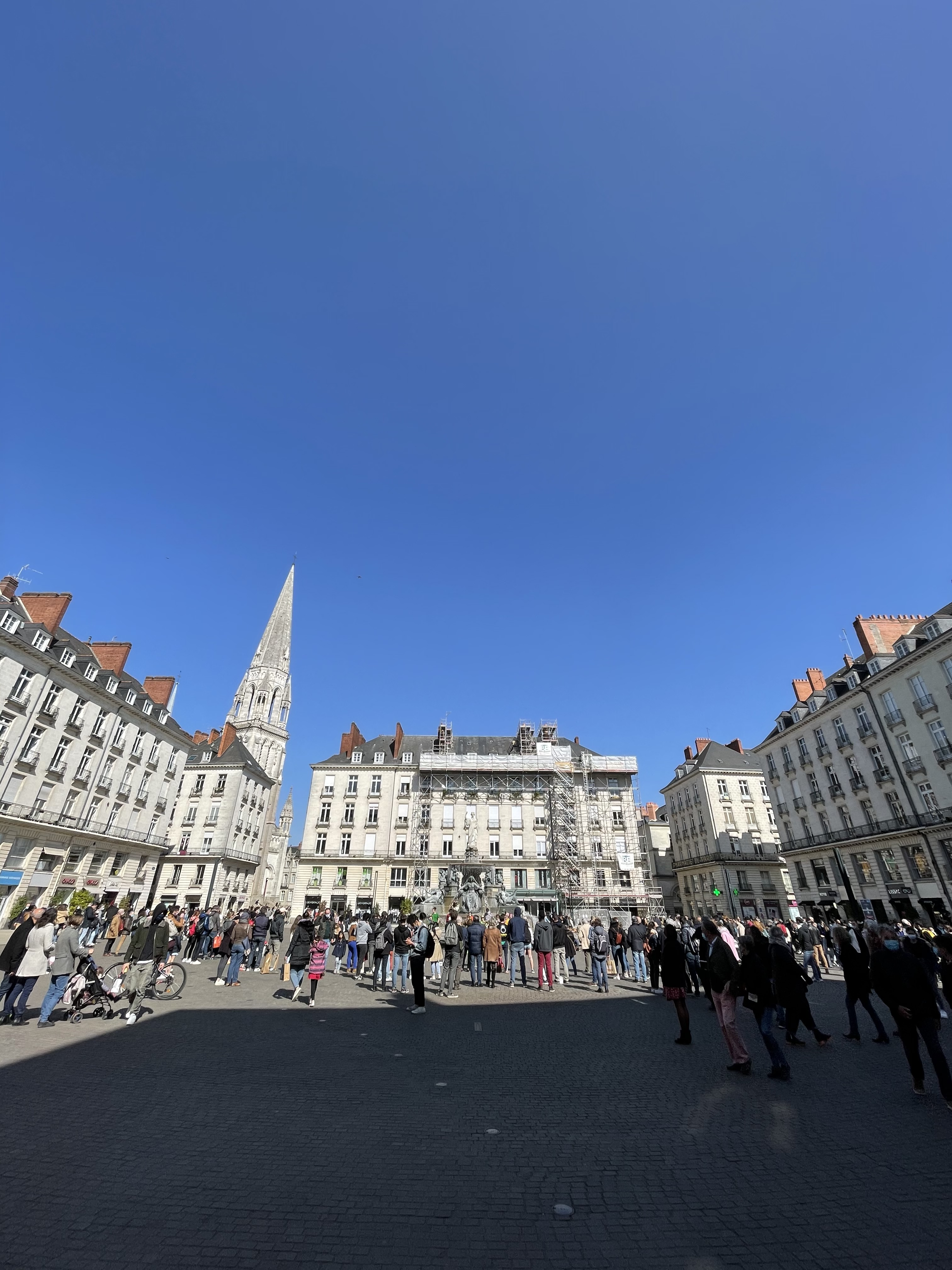
Place Royale seen from Rue Crébillon in 2021.

=== 21st-century renovation ===
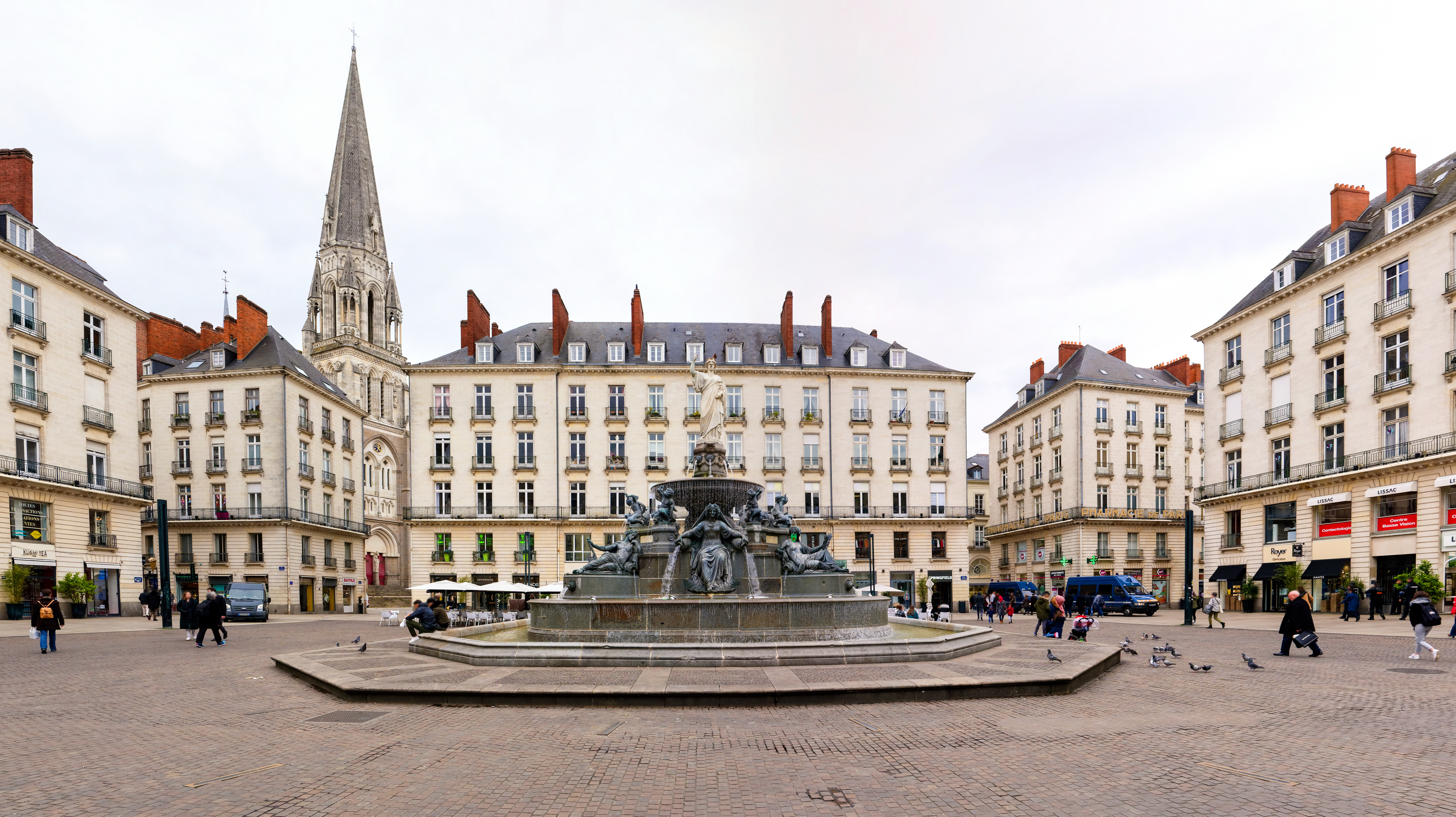
Place Royale renovated in March 2019.

The urban policy of the municipality led by Jean-Marc Ayrault, elected in 1989, begun in the 1990s, entered a new phase in the mid-2000s, that of enhancing the squares of the city center, the main ones being Place Saint-Pierre and Place Royale. They then had functions related to the automobile: circulation and parking. The elected officials decided to transform them to fulfill the social and cultural functions they expected.

The fountain, long relegated to the role of roundabout ornament, was renovated from February to March 2007. The square was modified to make it more pedestrian-friendly. This transformation was inaugurated on 6 April 2007.

While the configuration of the esplanade changed, it was part of the commercial areas that see an increase in the establishment of bank branches at the expense of other shops. A charter was even signed in 2007 between the Banks Committee of Pays de la Loire, the Chamber of Commerce and Industry of Nantes and Saint-Nazaire, and the town hall to limit these installations, without however calling into question the existing ones (the square then houses four bank branches).

Since 2011, Place Royale has become entirely pedestrian, as has the Rue Crébillon in its extension.

== Notable buildings and places of memory ==
=== Historic shops ===
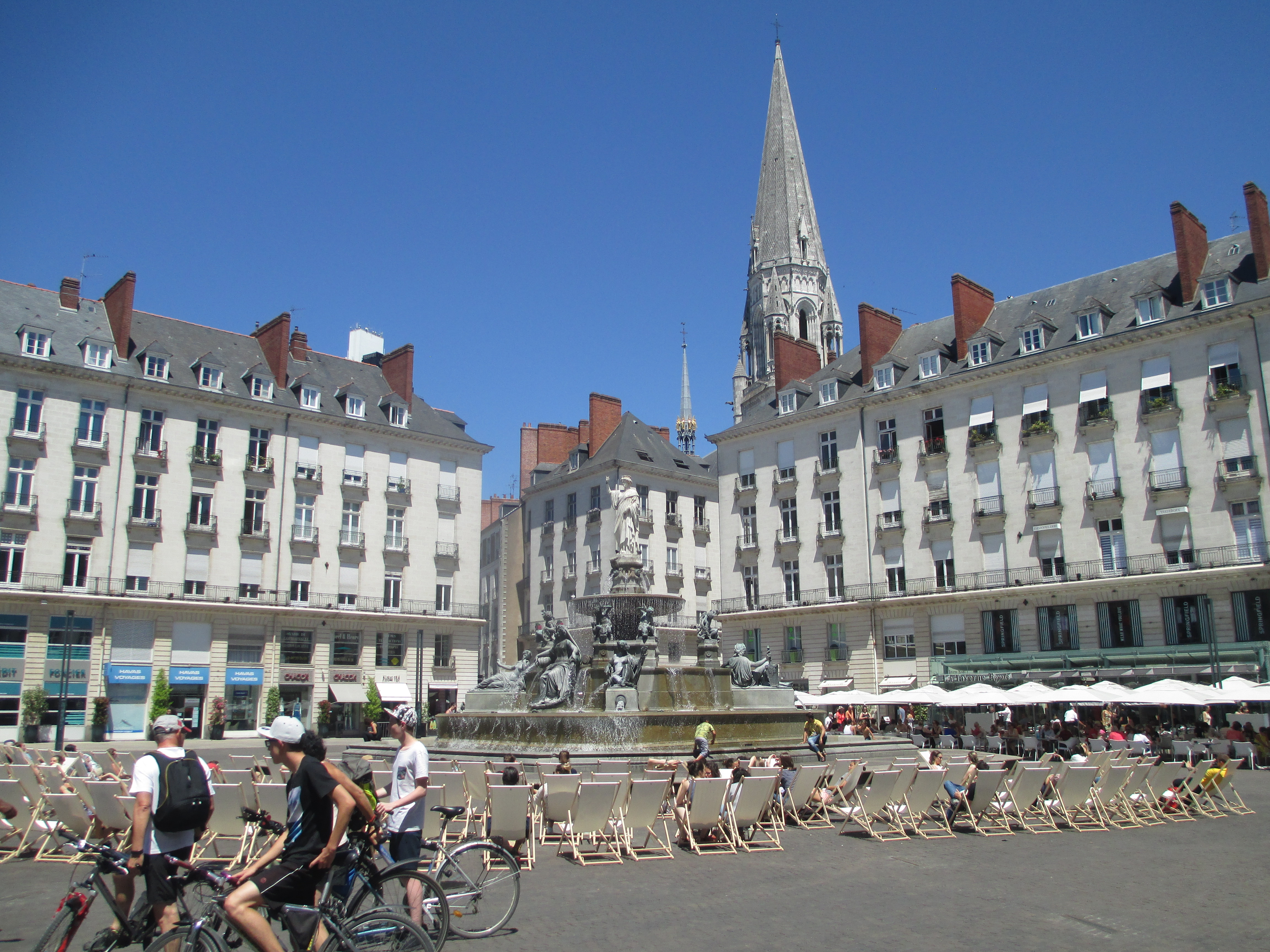
Place Royale and Saint-Nicolas Basilica (June 2017).

From the outset, the square was devoted to commerce, Crucy having taken into account the needs of merchants by adopting the ground floor/mezzanine structure. The central position of the esplanade has attracted renowned emporia. Thus, in 1870, at the north corner with the Rue d'Orléans, an establishment of the "À la grande maison" group was installed, replaced in 1900 by "Au Grand bon marché," which was established in ten cities around the world. Seven branches of this confection shop will be created in the region. At the same place, in the 1920s–1930s, it was a florist, "Au Mimosa," that was in place which offered, contained a mezzanine, and housed an orchestra.

Destroyed during World War II, the café was rebuilt, its mezzanine disappearing on this occasion. In 1960, a glass terrace was installed on the façade. The emporium disappeared on 1 May 1987. (only the commercial emporium changed; the simplified joint-stock company "Café Continental," which held it, has existed since 1955), and became a brasserie. In 2000, during renovation works, the inscription "Café Continental" was uncovered, then covered over again. At the corner with the Rue Saint-Julien, "À la Renommée" offered Nantes berlingots. This emporium was run by the heirs of Mrs. Couët, the first to have sold this type of candy in Nantes; she had started offering them not far from Place Royale, under a building porch at a corner of the Rue Du Couëdic. The "À la renommée" shop was created by her daughter, Rue de la Fosse, before returning to the square.

The pharmacies of the square stood out for their longevity. Between the Rue des Vieilles-Douves and Rue Saint-Julien, the "Pharmacie de la Place Royale" held the record for presence on the esplanade, having been founded in 1793 and disappearing only in 2010. The "Grande pharmacie de Paris," which became "Pharmacie de Paris," founded in 1900, was "Le Continental" the oldest shop still in operation on Place Royale.

=== Events ===
This square was associated with all social movements and events indicates Stéphane Pajot. If May 68 was its most symbolic illustration, other major dates have been celebrated there: on 11 November 1918, at the announcement by the city's bells of the signing of the armistice, a hay cart passing through the square was used to fuel a bonfire; the square and its fountain are invaded during demonstrations as part of the May–June 1936 strike movement. This tradition has endured: in the early 21st century still, the square has often been chosen as a gathering place (among others, in the 2010s: support concert for the "Libérons l'énergie" action of Greenpeace by the group Tryo in 2012, intervention of the Hommen on the sidelines of the demonstration against "marriage for all", gathering against homophobia) or demonstration of joy for political or sporting events (among others, celebration after the result of the presidential election in 2012, celebration of the promotion to Ligue 1 of FC Nantes in 2013).

As part of the Estuaire 2007 contemporary art biennale, Place Royale hosted the creation of Tatzu Nishi, Hôtel Nantes. The fountain was enclosed in a temporary structure, and its upper part (statue of Nantes with its basin, and the tritons at its feet) became the center of a room visited by day and rented at night. In 2012, as part of the "Voyage à Nantes," the fountain was again enclosed in a structure, Mont Royal(e), which allowed climbing its outer walls and "almost cave exploration" of the interior. During the 2020 edition of this same Nantes art event, the Voyage à Nantes, the fountain monument in the middle of this square was temporarily adorned with a new sculpture, created by Elsa Sahal.

The square was also the chosen meeting point for the first "apéro géant" organized in France in 2009, and taken up in other cities thereafter. These massive and controversial gatherings were again organized on the square in 2010 and 2011.

== See also ==
- Nantes
- Cours Cambronne
- Félix-Fournier square
- Place Saint-Pierre, Nantes

== Bibliography ==
- Aussel, Michel (2002). Nantes sous la Monarchie de Juillet. Nantes: Ouest éditions. ISBN 2-908261-78-2.
- Cosneau, Claude (1978). Cosneau (ed.). Iconographie de Nantes. Nantes: musée Dobrée.
- Cosneau, Claude (1986). Cosneau (ed.). Mathurin Crucy (1749-1826). Nantes: musée Dobrée.
- Eve, Armand (1992). "La place Royale, ses cafés et la fontaine monumentale" [Place Royale, its cafés and the monumental fountain] (PDF). Les Annales de Nantes et du pays nantais (246). Nantes: Société académique de Nantes et de la Loire-Atlantique: 19–21. ISSN 0991-7179. Archived from the original (PDF) on 23 September 2015.
- Darin, Michel; Meillerais, Odile; Saudrais, Franck (1991). Transformations des places à Nantes depuis deux siècles [Transformations of squares in Nantes over two centuries]. École d'architecture de Nantes. p. 255.
- Saudrais, Franck (1991). "La place Royale". Transformations des places à Nantes depuis deux siècles [Transformations of squares in Nantes over two centuries].
- Jeulin, Docteur (1974). "La Révolution dans le quartier de Saint-Nicolas" [The Revolution in the Saint-Nicolas quarter]. Les Annales de Nantes et du pays nantais (171–172). Nantes: Société académique de Nantes et de la Loire-Atlantique: 24–26. ISSN 0991-7179.
- Kahn, Claude; Landais, Jean (1992). Nantes et les Nantais sous le Second Empire [Nantes and the Nantais under the Second Empire] (in French). Nantes: Ouest éditions et Université inter-âges de Nantes. p. 300. ISBN 2-908261-92-8.
- Pageot, Auguste (1994). "Histoire véridique de la fontaine de la place Royale (1939)" [True history of the fountain of Place Royale (1939)] (PDF). Les Annales de Nantes et du pays nantais (252). Nantes: Société académique de Nantes et de la Loire-Atlantique: 37–39. ISSN 0991-7179. Archived from the original (PDF) on 23 September 2015..
- Pajot, Stéphane (2010). Nantes histoire de rues [Nantes street history] (in French). Les Sables d'Olonne: d'Orbestier. ISBN 978-2-84238-126-4.
- Pajot, Stéphane (2011). Nantes [old cafés and shops] (in French). Saint-Sébastien-sur-Loire: d'Orbestier. ISBN 978-2-84238-133-2.
- Pied, Édouard (1906). Notices sur les rues de Nantes [Notices on the streets of Nantes]. A. Dugas. pp. 257–259.
- Salaün, Gildas (April 2007). "Aux sources de la fontaine de la place Royale" [At the sources of the fountain of Place Royale]. La Lettre (66). Nantes Renaissance.
- Treuttel, Jean-Jacques (1997). Nantes, un destin contrasté [Nantes, a contrasting destiny] (in French). Nantes: Hartmann Éditions. ISBN 2-912344-00-X.
- Université de Nantes. Service formation continue dont université permanente (1984). Çà et là par les rues de Nantes [Here and there through the streets of Nantes]. Nantes: Reflets du passé. p. 207. ISBN 2-86507-016-6. Université.
- Wester, Pascale (November 2007). "La place Royale et sa pudique fontaine" [Place Royale and its prudish fountain]. Nantes Au Quotidien (179). Mairie de Nantes: 27–29.
