= Garenne Lemot estate =

Park in Loire-Atlantique and Vendée, France

La Garenne Lemot
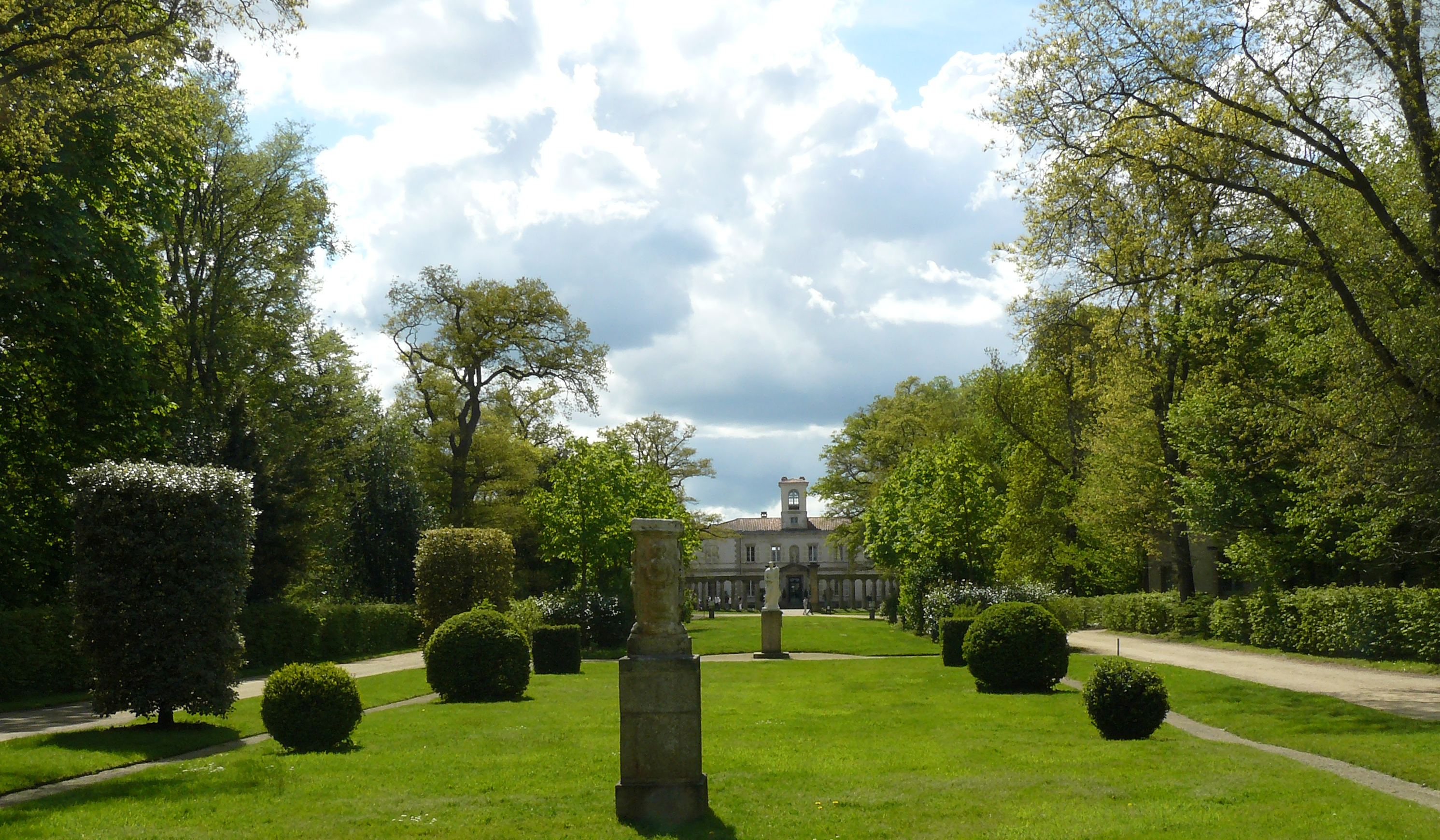
- View of the access avenue to the Villa Lemot
- Interactive map of La Garenne Lemot
- Type: Landscape garden
- Location: Clisson and Loire-Atlantique, France
- Coordinates: 47.085005°N 1.275905°W
- Area: 13
- Elevation: Between 13 and 35
- Established: 1806
- Water: Sèvre Nantaise
- Website: grand-patrimoine.loire-atlantique.fr/garenne-lemot

The La Garenne Lemot estate (French: Domaine de la Garenne Lemot; Breton: domani Garenne Lemot) is a park located in the communes of Gétigné and Clisson in Loire-Atlantique, as well as Cugand in Vendée. It was created by the sculptor François-Frédéric Lemot at the beginning of the 19th century. The ensemble is intended as a tribute to the landscapes and architecture of Italy. The estate consists of a neo-Palladian villa overlooking the valley of the Sèvre Nantaise, as well as woods and gardens where fabriques and statues in the Antique style, along with the gardener's and gatekeeper's houses in an Italianate style, are erected.

The Departmental Council of Loire-Atlantique purchased the estate from the Lemot family in 1968. It was listed as a historic monument the following year and has been classified in stages since 1988. Currently, it is a place for strolls and a cultural center where contemporary art exhibitions and performances are regularly organized.

== Location ==
The La Garenne Lemot estate is located in the southeast of the Loire-Atlantique department, on the border with Vendée, in the valley of the Sèvre Nantaise. At the southeastern edge of the commune of Clisson, it extends mainly over the territory of the commune of Gétigné. The park occupies an entire hillside within a loop formed by the river, from the heights at thirty-five meters above sea level along the former Route nationale 149 between Nantes and Poitiers, down to the riverbanks, twenty meters lower. The total area of the estate is 13 hectares. It is open to the public every day, with free access.

However, the park has the particularity of including elements located outside the estate, on the other side of the river, placed there to create perspectives with the buildings and garden features. These fabriques are located in the territories of the communes of Clisson and Cugand.

== History ==
=== Origin of the site ===
Originally, the land known as the "Bois de la Garenne" was a hunting reserve belonging to the lords of Clisson. The site is situated on granitic terrain, then covered with heaths and about four hundred oaks.

During the French Revolution, during the Vendée Wars, the Clisson valley was devastated. In response to the levée en masse of three hundred thousand men by the Convention in 1793, the Clisson district rose in insurrection. After battles between the Vendéens and Republicans, the "Mayençais" of Jean-Baptiste Kléber set fire to the Clisson castle and many houses. In January 1794, the infernal columns finished destroying Clisson, the church, and many houses in the village of Gétigné. The town's population used the oaks from the garenne around 1796 to build shelters while awaiting the reconstruction of their homes. It was in this context of rebuilding the valley that the arrival of François-Frédéric Lemot changed the fate of the estate.

=== Art museum ===
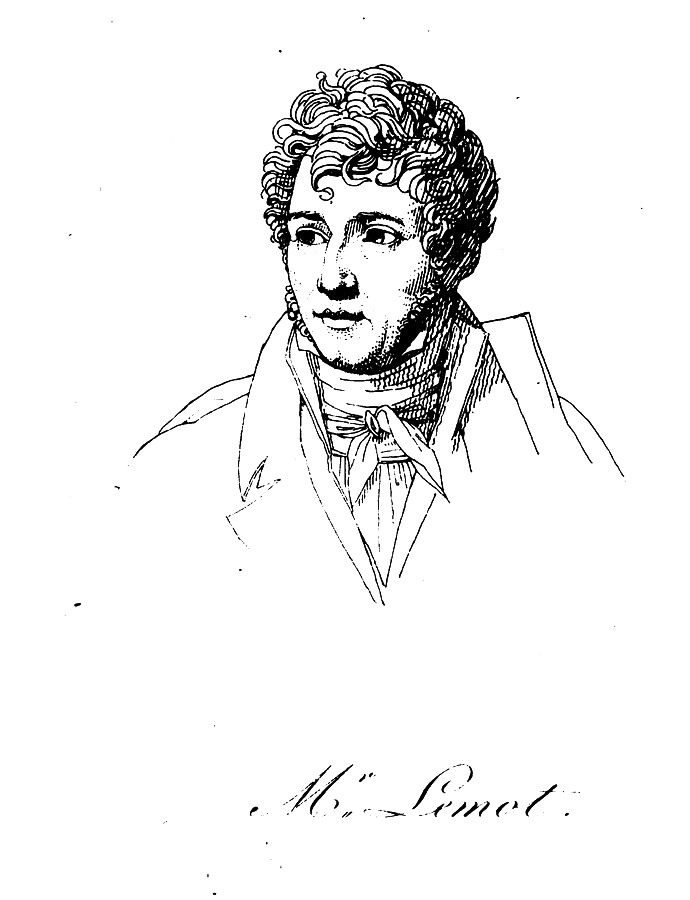
François-Frédéric Lemot.

In 1805, François-Frédéric Lemot, a sculptor from Lyon, was drawn to Clisson by François Cacault (1743–1805), a diplomat and former deputy of Loire-Inférieure. The latter, along with his brother Pierre Cacault (1744–1810), an artist painter, had founded a museum there with numerous art collections amassed during their stays in Italy.

Both men wished to make it a place of welcome for artists. While stationed in Rome, François Cacault had the opportunity to associate with artists residing at the French Academy in Rome, including François-Frédéric Lemot, Prix de Rome winner in sculpture in 1790. By settling in Clisson, the artists around Cacault sought to rediscover the landscape paintings of the Roman countryside in the hills overlooking the Sèvre.

According to François-Frédéric Lemot, Nicolas Poussin was inspired by the Sèvre valley to paint the landscapes of his painting Diogène jetant son écuelle, currently housed at the Louvre Museum. This legend is false but remains an invitation for artists to explore the region. Upon his arrival in 1805 with other artists, the sculptor was struck by the resemblance to Italy:

When I arrived in Clisson, I was so surprised and struck by the great character of the landscape that I felt transported to Italy. I could not stop contemplating the richness and variety of its admirable scenes, where nature seemed to display all its picturesque magnificence. The Bois de la Garenne, in particular, held me constantly with the beauty of its vegetation, its rocks, its waterfalls, the expanse of its viewpoints, and night always found me with a pencil in hand during these solitary walks.

— François-Frédéric Lemot, Notice historique sur la ville et le château de Clisson, 1812

=== Transformation of the site by Lemot ===
François-Frédéric Lemot acquired the Garenne property on 26 June 1805 and immediately began preparatory drawings for his estate project. He developed it continuously until his death in 1827. The inspirations remained Italian; François-Frédéric Lemot aimed to recreate an idealized historical landscape painting evoking, as in the works of Poussin, the countryside of Tuscany, Latium, and Umbria. The sculptor wanted to give the site the air of Tivoli, a spectacular city and grand landscape, a favorite study subject for artists staying in Italy. He enlisted the Nantes architect Mathurin Crucy, also a Prix de Rome winner in 1774, to draft his designs. The entire project was overseen on-site by the Clisson estate manager, Joseph Gautret (1771–1855), who resided in the gardener's house. The correspondence between the two men provides insight into the stages of the estate's development. The property covered a total area of twenty-five hectares, of which the park was only the center: Baron Lemot was a true landowner, owning several meierhofs. His properties were elevated to the rank of Majorat the day before his death.

The park was developed from 1806; François-Frédéric Lemot planted 280 trees, followed by a thousand poplars the next year along the Sèvre and on the river's islands. Gautret and his workers devoted 360 days to this task and to clearing brush and brambles. The manager even acquired ferrets to eliminate the rabbits in the garenne. At the same time, three avenues were laid out, converging toward the terrace and the future site of the villa. The small paths were bordered with lilacs and hazels. François-Frédéric Lemot demanded dense vegetation over most of the park to create surprise effects. A vegetable garden, now gone, was laid out and enclosed between 1807 and 1808: around a basin, a three-hectare nursery was planted to allow various species to mature before planting in the park. Along the Sèvre's banks, the terrain was leveled from September 1806, and a meadow was established. Between 1807 and 1809, two hundred poplars were planted along the banks and on the small islands, along with a hundred willows. Some park developments strictly followed the chapter "les Jardins" from Pierre Henri de Valenciennes's treatise: Éléments de perspective pratique, a l'usage des artistes, suivis de réflexions et conseils à un élève sur la peinture, et particulièrement sur le genre du paysage, Paris, Victor Desenne, J.-B.-M. Duprat, Jules-Louis-Melchior Porthmann, 1799. The park is thus a recomposition of a historical landscape painting on the scale of nature, making it a unique project.

Gautret employed up to thirteen people for park maintenance. Seeds were transported from Nantes or Paris. Local species were favored for tree selection, accompanied by shrubs to create thickets. Numerous pines were also planted, extending to the hills on the other side of the Sèvre, between the obelisk and the Clisson castle, from 1809. François-Frédéric Lemot declared: "I want to multiply this tree greatly in the park and the region, which will give it entirely the appearance of Italy"(7 March 1809). Roses were installed from 1814. From the same year, vines were also planted: first, chasselas vines on brick pillars along the main entrance path, forming a trellis. Then, four thousand vine plants were installed on the sunny hillside in 1827. Exotic tree species were introduced at the end of the 19th century.

The buildings were constructed in Italian-inspired styles. The gardener's house was built from 1811 to 1815, likely based on plans by Mathurin Crucy or François-Léonard Seheult. Crucy drafted plans for a villa, with construction starting in 1816. The work and plans were taken over by the Parisian architect Pierre-Louis van Cleemputte (1758–1834) in 1824, but François-Frédéric Lemot never saw its completion. The garden fabriques were built by Mathurin Crucy and François-Frédéric Lemot between 1818 and 1823. Upon his death, François-Frédéric Lemot was buried in the Temple of Friendship, a former funeral chapel arranged in the Clisson cemetery, opposite the castle, across the Sèvre.

=== Evolution of the site after the death of François-Frédéric Lemot ===
The son of François-Frédéric Lemot, Barthélémy (1810–1883), decided to settle in Clisson in 1841 and served as mayor of the town several times until 1881. He completed the development of the villa but also had the belvedere, the monumental staircase, the Gallery of Illustrious Men, the stone colonnade enclosing the courtyard, and the icehouse constructed. As the town's first magistrate, he promoted the Italianate style in the construction of several public buildings.

In the 1950s and 1960s, the estate served as a reception center called "Le Joyeux Nid" for children in difficulty under the care of child welfare services. It remained in the possession of the sculptor's descendants until 1968, when the estate was sold to the Departmental Council of Loire-Atlantique. The estate then began to be subject to protection measures as a historic monument. In 1969, the villa and the Temple of Vesta were listed, followed by the Henri IV column and the surrounding park in 1986. By decree of 14 March 1988, the entire park and its fabriques, the exterior of the villa, and the gardener's house were classified as historic monuments, along with the exterior of the Temple of Friendship and the obelisk on the left bank. In 2000, the gatekeeper's house, the last unprotected building, was classified.

The estate hosted the Frac des Pays de la Loire from 1988 until 1994, when it relocated to Nantes. In 1990, a documentary exhibition on the estate's history and Italianate architecture was permanently installed in the gardener's house. In the same building, the Center for Studies on Heritage and Italianity in Architecture (CÉPIA) organized conferences, summer universities on-site, and produced publications in the field of architecture and heritage.

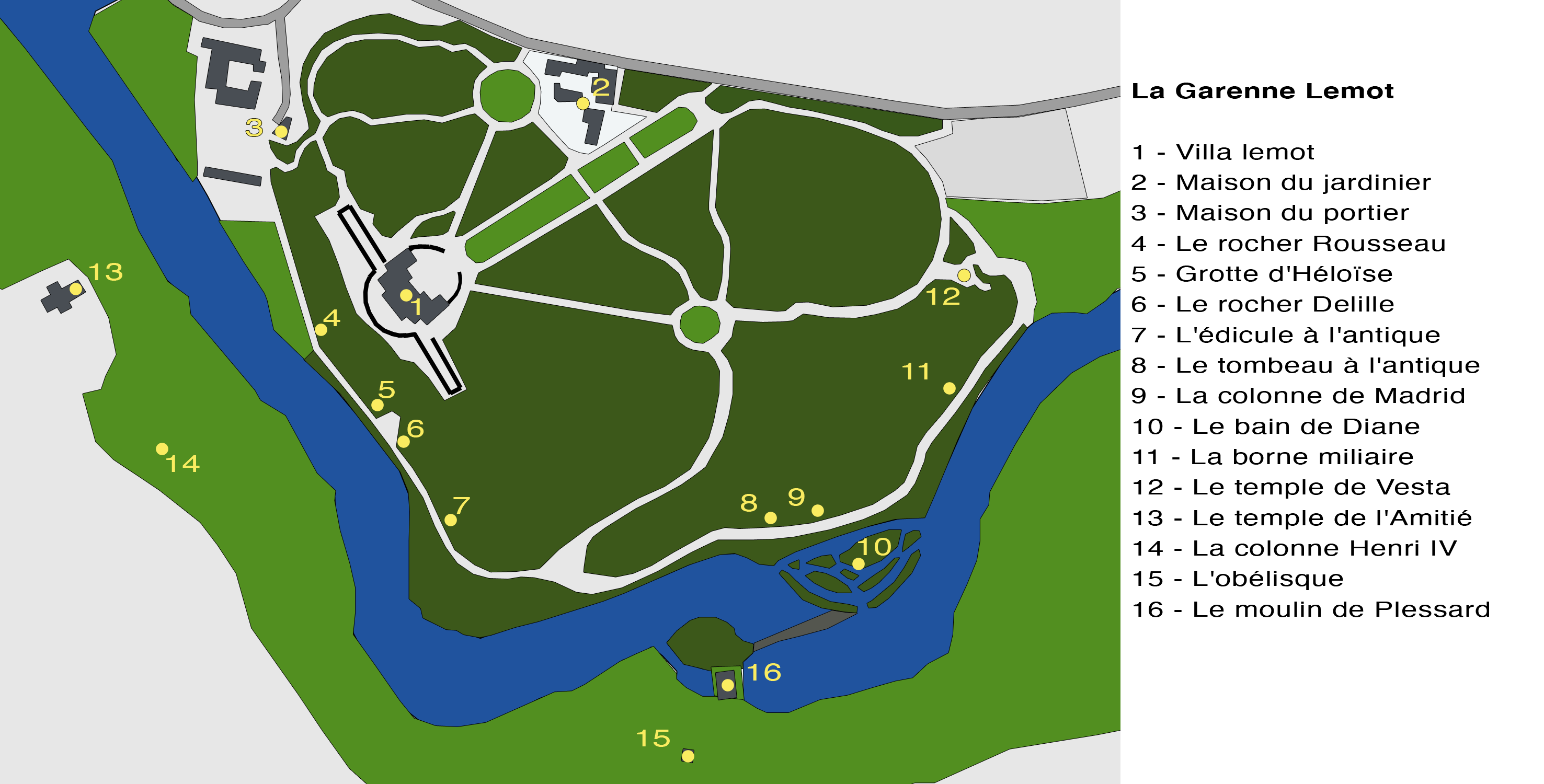
Map of the La Garenne Lemot estate.

== Architecture ==
François-Frédéric Lemot, being a sculptor and not an architect, enlisted neoclassical architects for the construction of the buildings within the estate. However, his drawings indicate that it was François-Frédéric Lemot who defined the main lines of the architectural project for all these buildings.

=== Villa Lemot ===
The building was erected by the architect Pierre-Louis van Cleemputte (1758–1834), after several projects by Mathurin Crucy. Its construction was planned from the outset of the project, but work did not begin until 1824. Its architecture is in the neo-Palladian style. Composed of a main building and two return wings, the southwest façade opens via a loggia onto the valley of the Sèvre and several follies located opposite, on the other side of the river. Barthélemy Lemot added a belvedere to the top of the building, as well as a colonnade in a hemicycle shape overlooking the three access paths to the villa. In 1872, he commissioned the architect Lenoir to complete the loggia. It was not until around 1930 that the former kitchen garden alley, opposite the villa, was widened into a grand access alley, with statues of Diana, Hippomenes and Atalanta, as well as floral kraters.

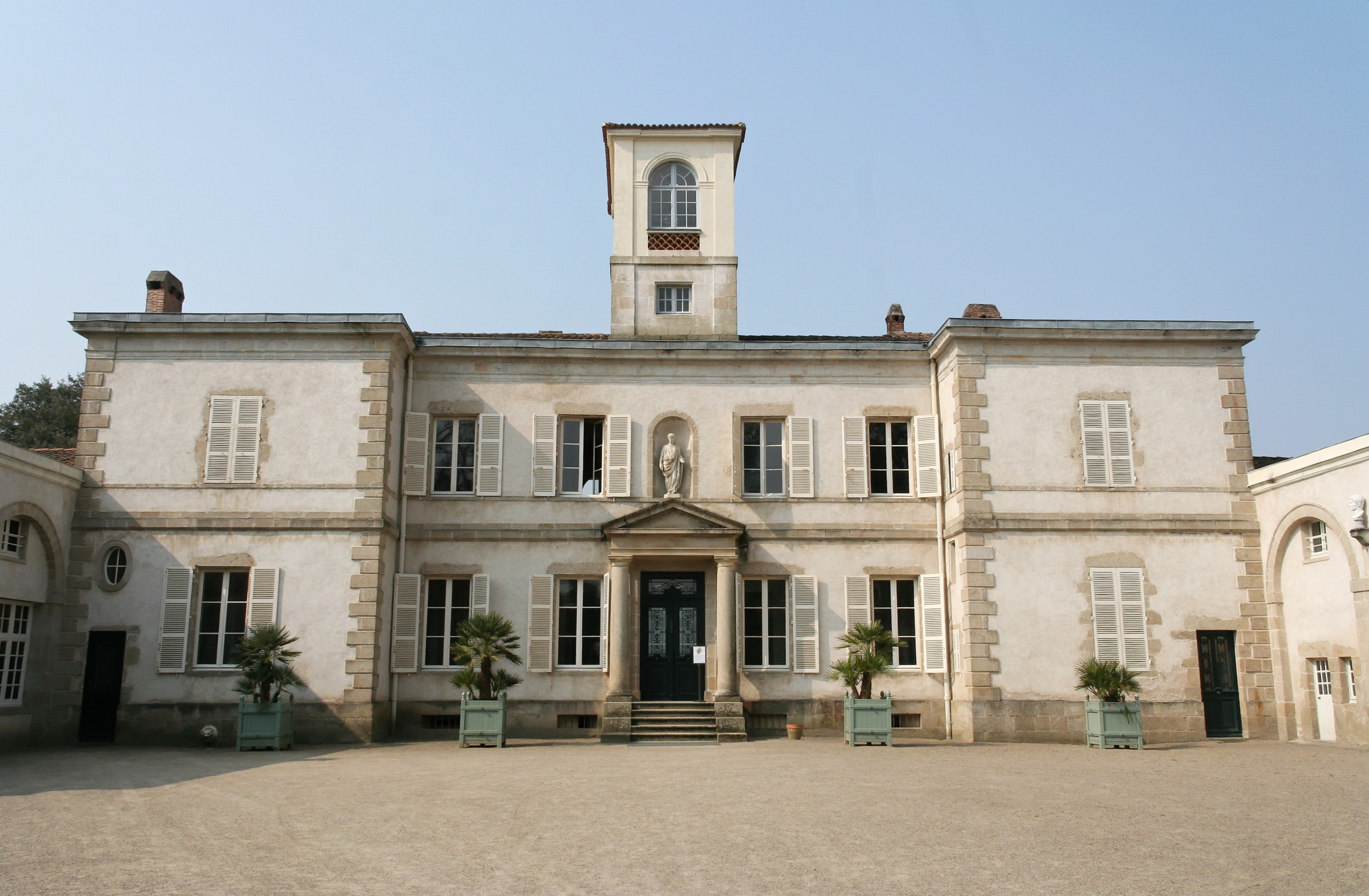
Northwest façade of the villa.

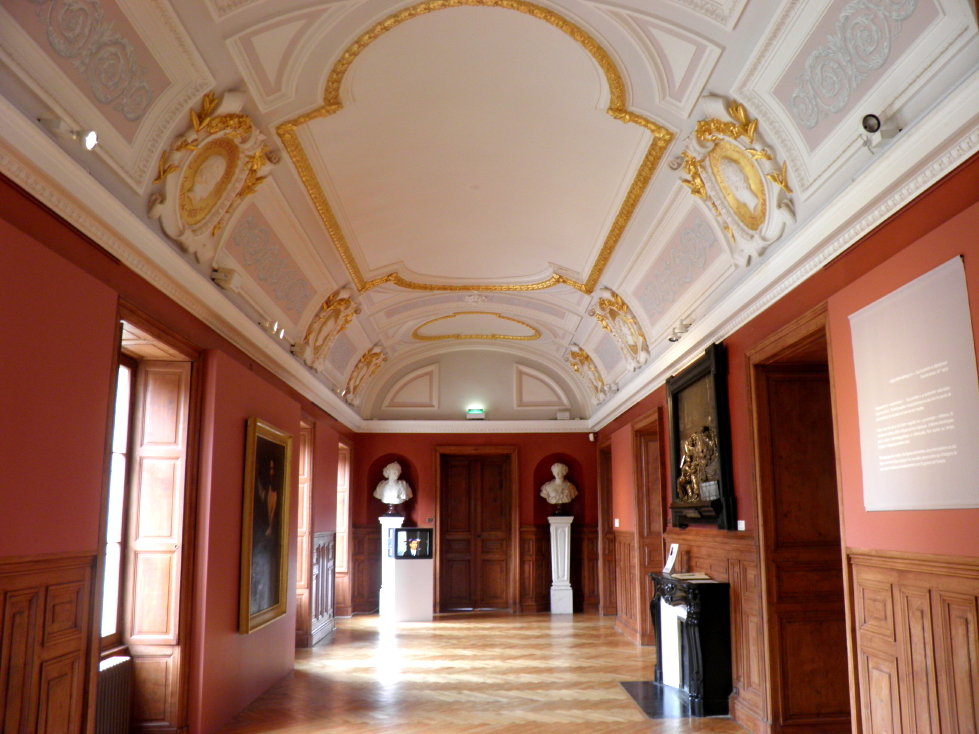
Gallery known as the Gallery of the Illustrious on the first floor.

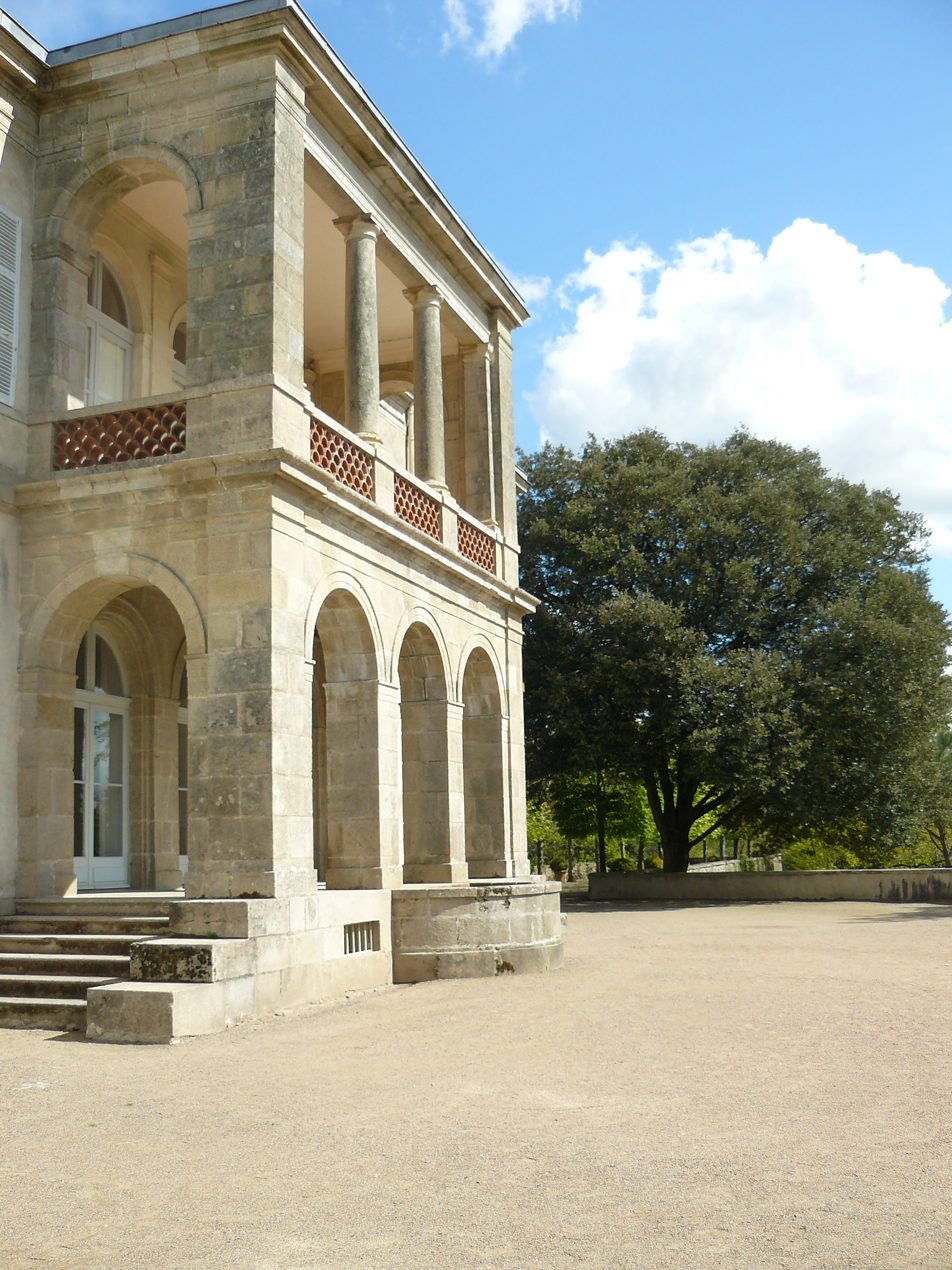
Southeast façade of the villa.

Inside, around 1866, Barthélémy Lemot also arranged the gallery of the illustrious on the first floor of the villa. This includes medallion representations of his father as well as seven other artists, friends of François-Frédéric: Claude Dejoux, sculptor and Lemot's teacher; Charles Percier, the architect; François Gérard, the painter; André Galle, sculptor; François-Joseph Talma, the tragedian; François Adrien Boieldieu, composer; and Antoine-Jean Gros, also a painter. These medallions were made from portraits by David d'Angers. The gallery also contains a series of four allegorical busts from the 17th century representing the seasons, works by Alessandro Rondoni, as well as a bronze cast of the Judgment of Solomon, the Prix de Rome winning work of François-Frédéric Lemot in 1790

As the center of gravity of the park, the villa commands several views over different follies and surrounding monuments: the antique-style obelisk to the east, the statue of Henri IV and the Temple of Friendship to the south, and the Château de Clisson to the west.

=== Gardener's and gatekeeper's houses ===
The gardener's house was the first building constructed on the estate, in an Italianate style. Two inspirations can be noticed: the crenelated walls and the dovecote tower recall the castelli of Umbria. In contrast, the entrance pavilion, adorned with a gallery topped by a loggia, is directly inspired by the casa colonica. This is a type of architectural model defined as part of an agrarian reform launched in the Tuscan countryside in the 1770s to rehouse peasants whose lands had been redistributed. Mathurin Crucy and François-Frédéric Lemot thus aimed to propose a model of agrarian reform already tested in the context of rebuilding the surrounding countryside. Construction began in 1811 and was completed in 1815. Rubble masonry was used for the main structure, but the rural Italian character is conveyed by the use of elongated brick (seventeen centimeters long by two centimeters thick). The flat roofs are covered with red tiles, and the presence of serlianas and round arch bays using brick gives the ensemble its southern character. The house is complemented by a barn, two sheds, and a dovecote. It was primarily in this building that François-Frédéric Lemot resided, as the villa was barely completed at the time of his death.

The gatekeeper's house was built in 1817 near the Sèvre riverbanks. Located at one of the park's entrances, it evokes rural Umbrian houses with its paired windows, (Note: In architecture, paired windows are windows grouped in twos without being directly in contact.) its low-arched windows on the upper floor, and the external staircase under an awning.

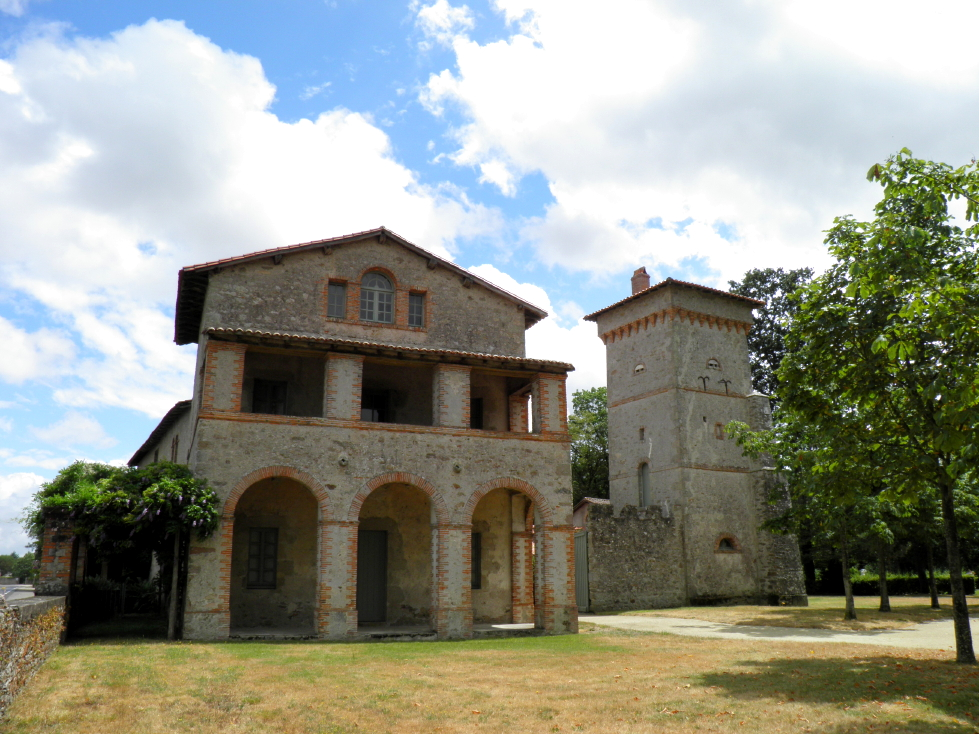
Gatekeeper's house.

=== Influence of the estate's architecture in the surrounding area ===
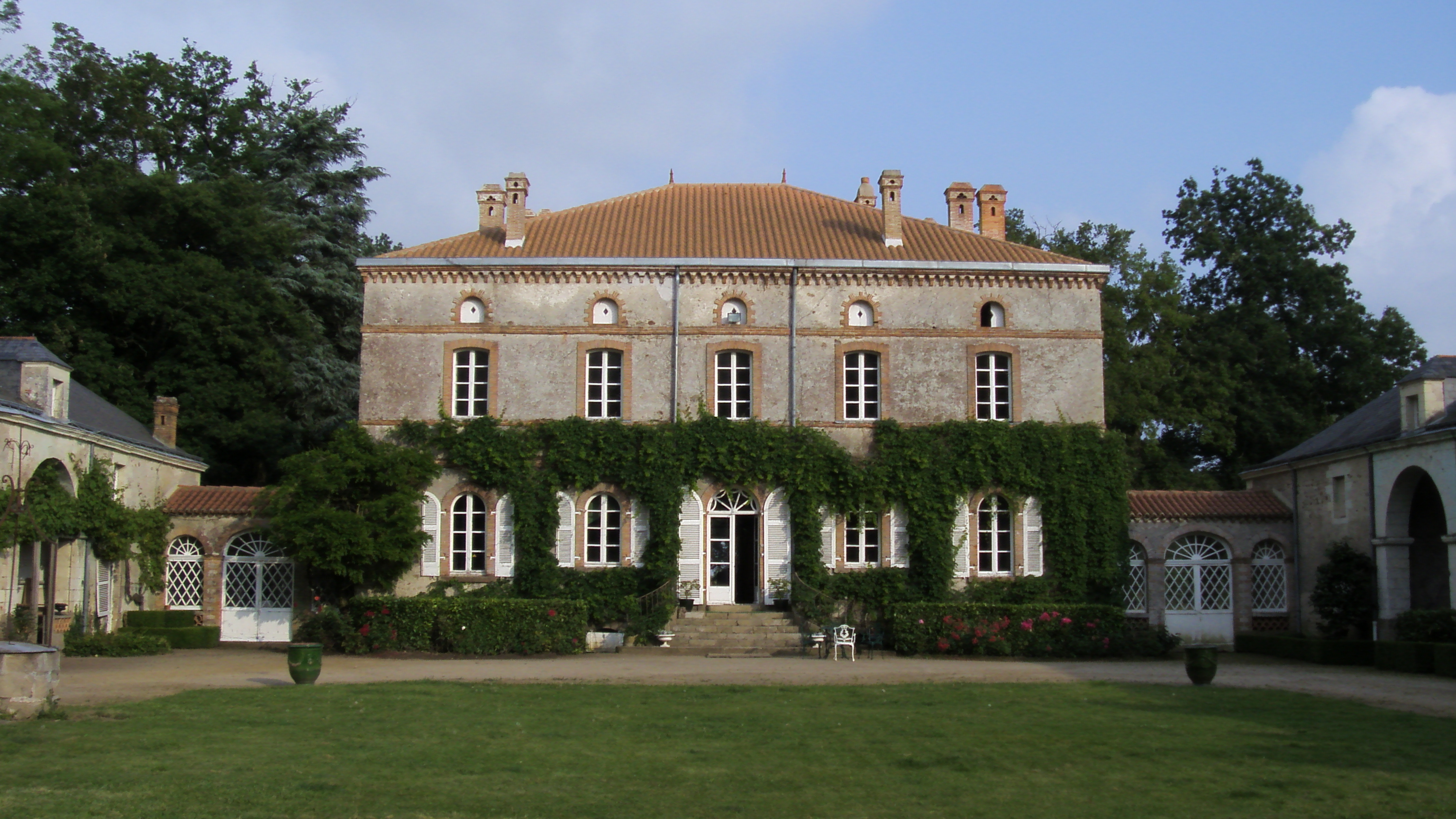
Main building of the Château de l'Oiselinière in Gorges

The arrival of François-Frédéric Lemot in Clisson corresponds to a period of reconstruction and transformation in the town and its surroundings. The Italianate style chosen for the estate by the sculptor directly influences a number of buildings constructed in the commune and residences built in this region of the Sèvre Nantaise valley. Thus, even though the initial reconstruction of Clisson after the Revolution used architectural elements and materials traditional to the region, several buildings soon drew direct inspiration from the Italian style introduced by François-Frédéric Lemot. During his eulogy delivered by the deputy mayor of Clisson in 1827, it was stated that "to please him, we sought in our constructions to approach the picturesque style to support his vision". The use of small-sized bricks, round tiles, the incorporation of serlianas, paired windows, low-pitched roofs, and Genoese cornices demonstrate this. These architectural elements are notably found in the former Hôtel de l'Europe, built in 1844–1845, in the asylum hall constructed by the commune in 1853 while Barthélémy Lemot was mayor of the town, and in the Busseuil house, built by a Nantes bookseller friend of Lemot.

The architectural influence of La Garenne Lemot is also evident in several estates built in the early 19th century in the Clisson region by wealthy landowners from Nantes or industrialists newly settled in the Sèvre valley. This is the case, for example, in Clisson itself, at the Garenne Valentin estate. The merchant Jacques-Charles Valentin, a friend of Lemot, established his residence in the former Benedictine convent of the Trinity, which he redeveloped and expanded in the Italian and neo-Palladian style between 1810 and 1817. This is also true of the Château de l'Oiselinière in Gorges, four kilometers northwest of Clisson, in the rustic Italian style, and the Noë Bel-Air estate in Vallet in the Palladian style. This influence is also found in several mills and factories established along the Sèvre.

== Garden features ==
=== Features located within the estate ===
The Temple of Vesta is the largest fabrique in the park, likely based on plans by Mathurin Crucy, modified by Cleemputte and François-Frédéric Lemot. Constructed from the summer of 1819 to July 1822, it is a direct reference to the Temple of Vesta in Tivoli. Taking the form of a tholos, with a circular plan, it consists of eighteen columns with Doric capitals, rather than Corinthian as in its Italian model. The shafts of the columns were carved from local granite, but the capitals and bases were sculpted in Paris. The central cella includes a door and three windows. It was intended to house a marble statue in its center, which was never realized. However, the walls between the windows once held plaster busts and terracotta statuettes, which have since disappeared. François-Frédéric Lemot wanted a basin behind the temple to supply a waterfall cascading under the fabrique and down to the Sèvre, to further imitate the gardens of Tivoli. This project was not completed. Only a vaulted passage in the stone base remains.

The Grotte d'Héloïse is set into the hillside facing the Sèvre. It is a direct reference to Héloïse d'Argenteuil, the lover of Peter Abelard, who was born in Le Pallet, nearby. In this arranged and transformed cave, a dedication by Antoine Peccot, nephew of Crucy, was engraved in 1813: "Héloïse perhaps wandered on this shore." According to Abelard himself, the future abbess came to her lover's hometown to give birth to Astrolabe. François-Frédéric Lemot thus attempted to suggest that she did so on the banks of the Sèvre, in the current park. The allusion also reflects the early Romanticism interest in the Middle Ages.

The Rousseau Rock bears the poem by the English poet William Shenstone, already engraved in the fountain cave of the Parc Jean-Jacques Rousseau. This park, one of the most famous fabrique parks of the 18th century in France, was a model for François-Frédéric Lemot. Only the first line changes: "Ô limpide fontaine" ("Oh limpid fountain") is replaced by "Ô limpide rivière" ("Oh limpid river"), a reference to the nearby Sèvre.

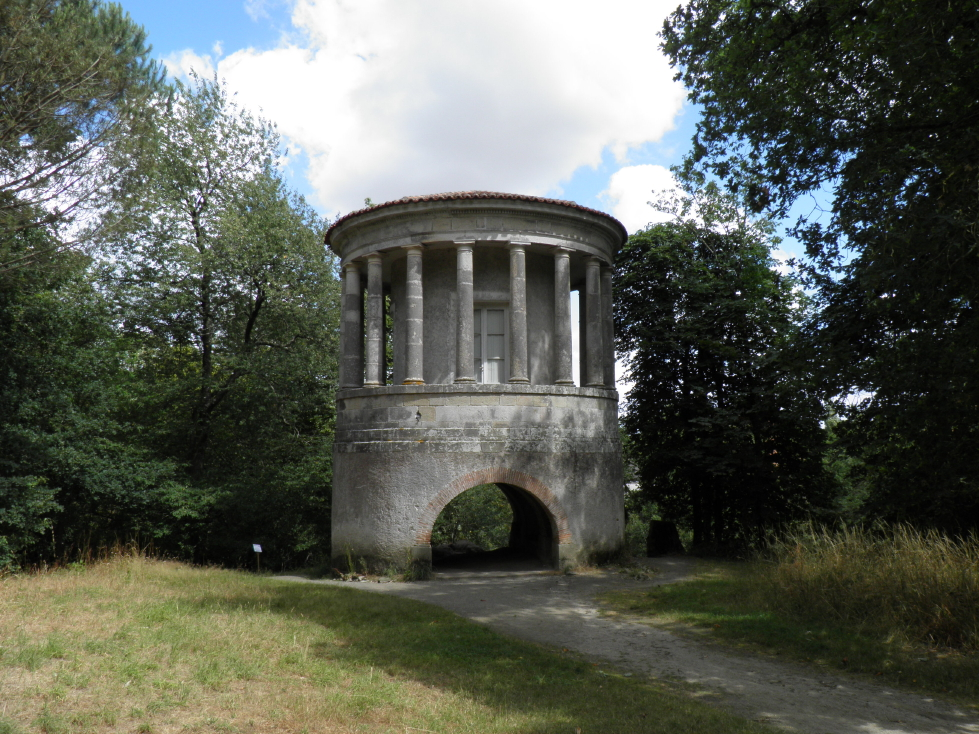
Rousseau Rock.

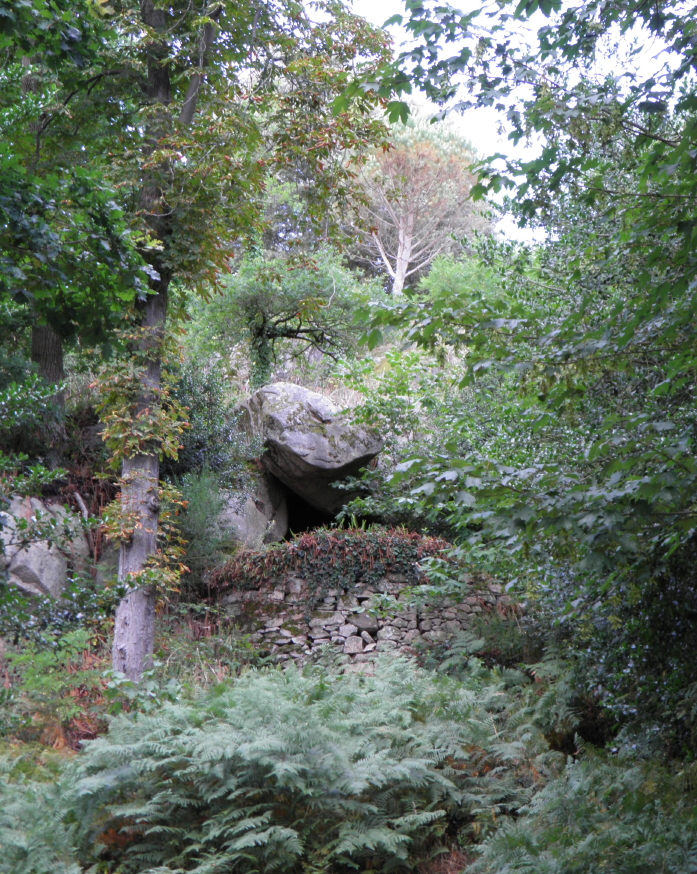
Grotte d'Héloïse.

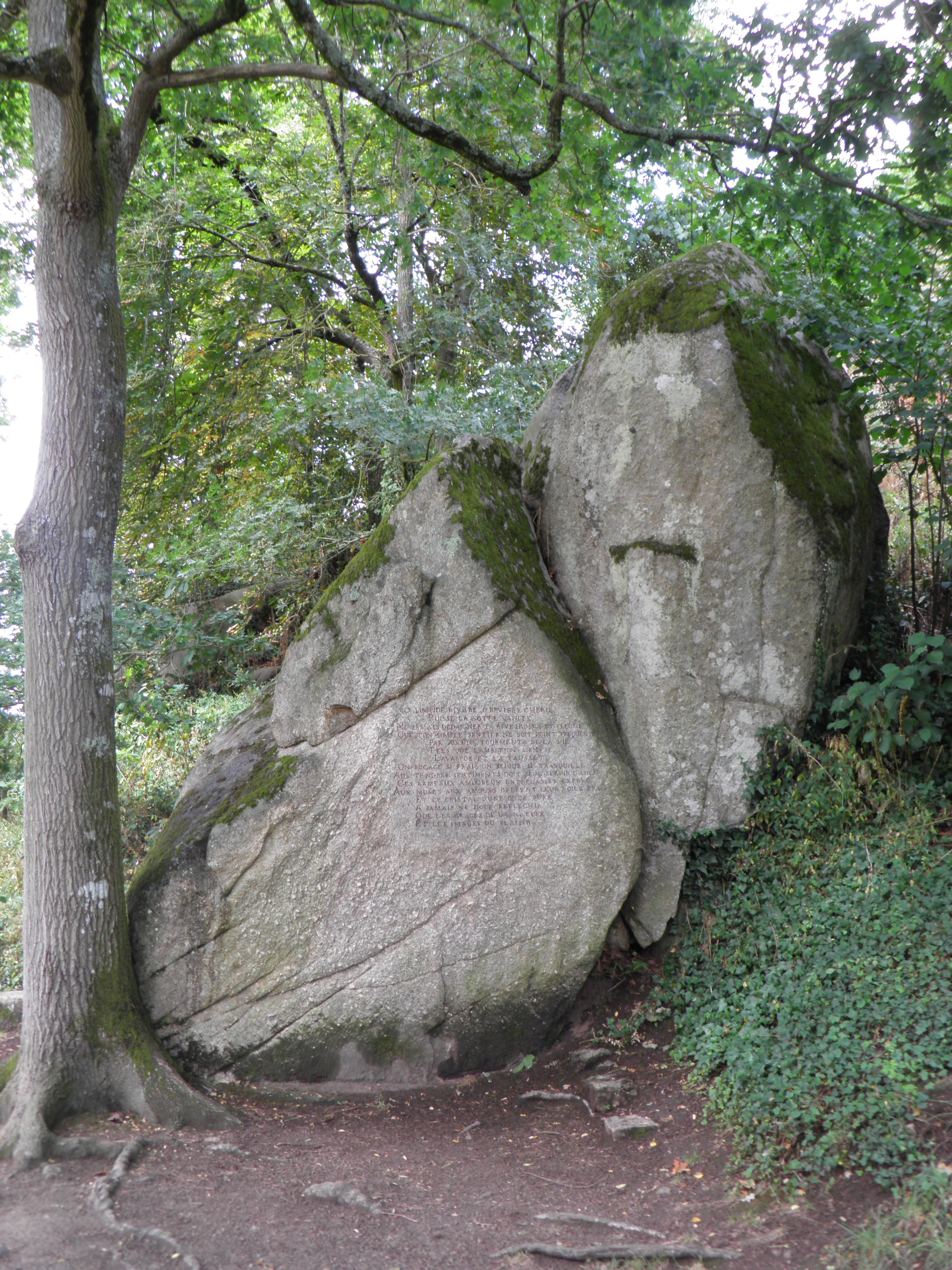
Rousseau Rock

The Delille Rock has borne a verse from the poet Jacques Delille's work Les Jardins since 1815: "Its indestructible mass has wearied time." This quotation is also present on a rock in the Château de Mortefontaine, another famous 18th century fabrique park near the Ermenonville Forest. At the foot of this rock, near the winding path, stands the statue of a Roman senator.

The antique edicule was designed by Crucy, taking the form of a rural oratory, like an ancient lararium. Featuring a circular niche on one side and a semicircular niche on the other, it was intended to house a statue of Ceres. This statue is now located in the central avenue. The edicule is built in stone and brick.

The antique tomb was also designed by Crucy. Carved by a local stonemason, it replicates the form of Jean-Jacques Rousseau's tomb on the Île des Peupliers in Ermenonville. It bore the painted inscription et in Arcadia Ego, now faded. This tomb also appears in the paintings of Hubert Robert and in an inscription on a burial in a painting of the same name by Nicolas Poussin. It is an allusion to Virgil, evoking the fragility of the world.

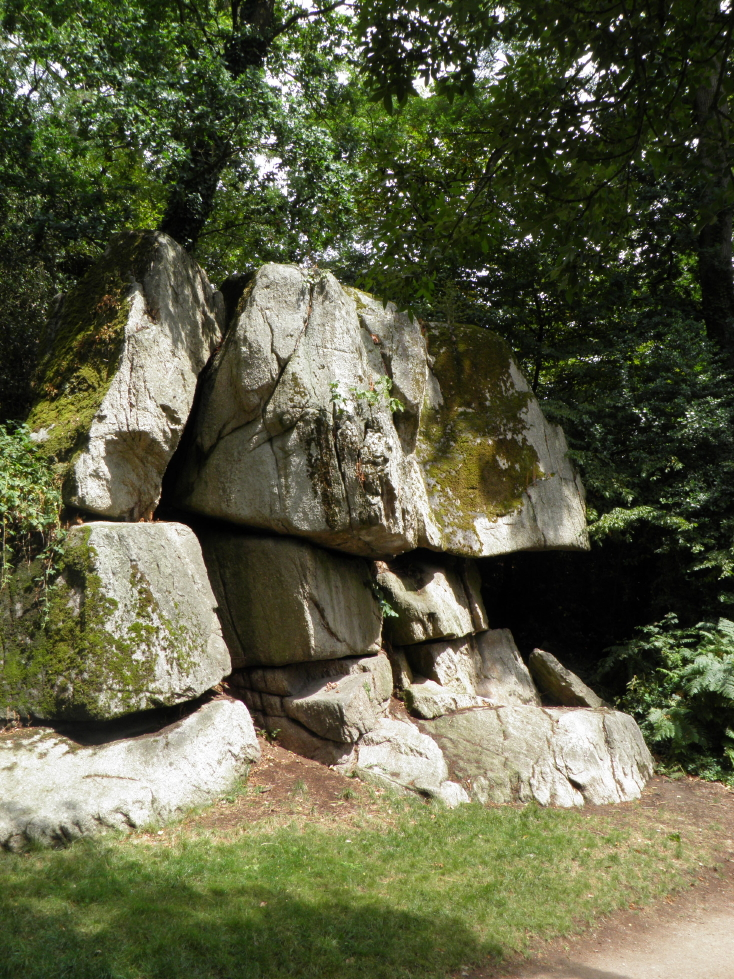
Delille Rock.

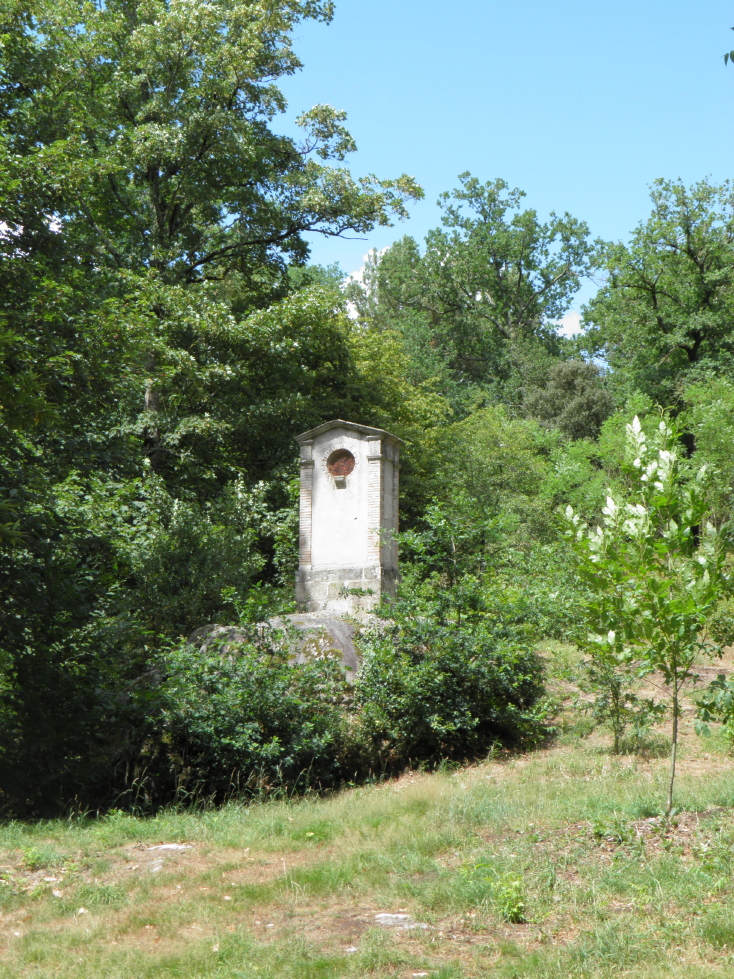
Antique edicule.

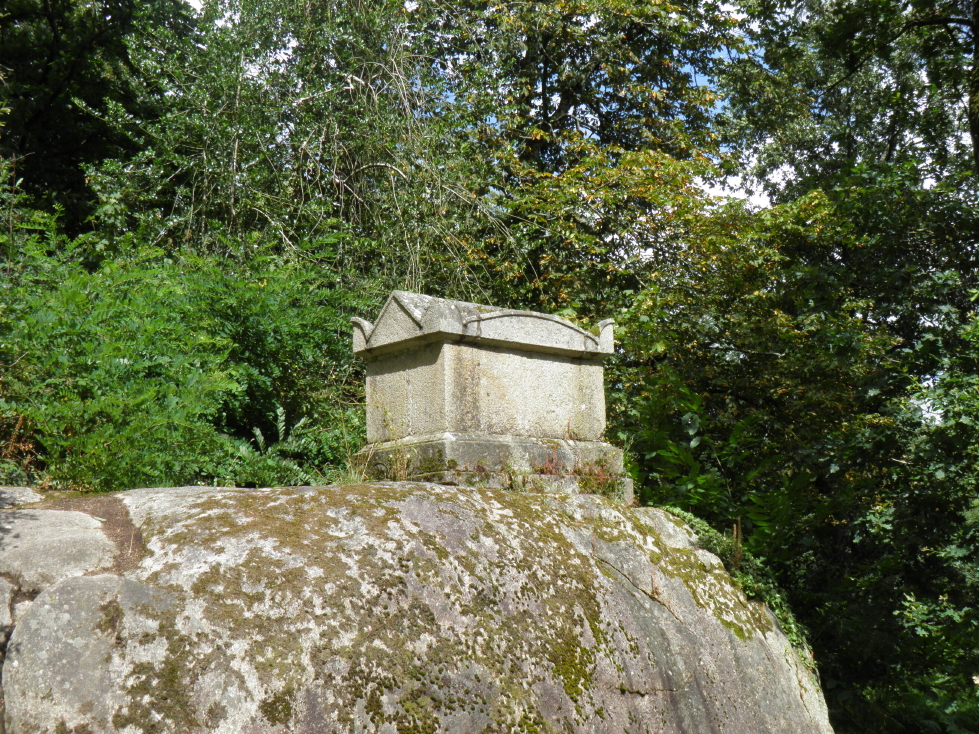
Antique tomb.

The Madrid Column is believed to be a reuse of an architectural element from the Château de Madrid. This Renaissance château was built in Neuilly-sur-Seine by Francis I and destroyed at the end of the 18th century. No archival evidence confirms this hypothesis. Nevertheless, it constitutes another homage to French history, particularly the Renaissance period.

The milestone was erected in 1813. According to François-Frédéric Lemot, the Roman road between Nantes and Poitiers crossed the estate, which has proven to be fanciful. However, this milestone was intended to recall the passage of this road through the park, along the river. On the other side of the path, a stone mounting block was arranged, modeled on ancient seats used by Roman riders to mount their horses.

The Baths of Diana is a natural rock formation arranged in 1815 in the riverbed, intended as a resting place for the Roman goddess of the hunt. For this, François-Frédéric Lemot drew inspiration from the banks of Lake Nemi near Rome and the Metamorphoses by Ovid. The wild effect of the site is enhanced by the groves of hornbeams planted around it.

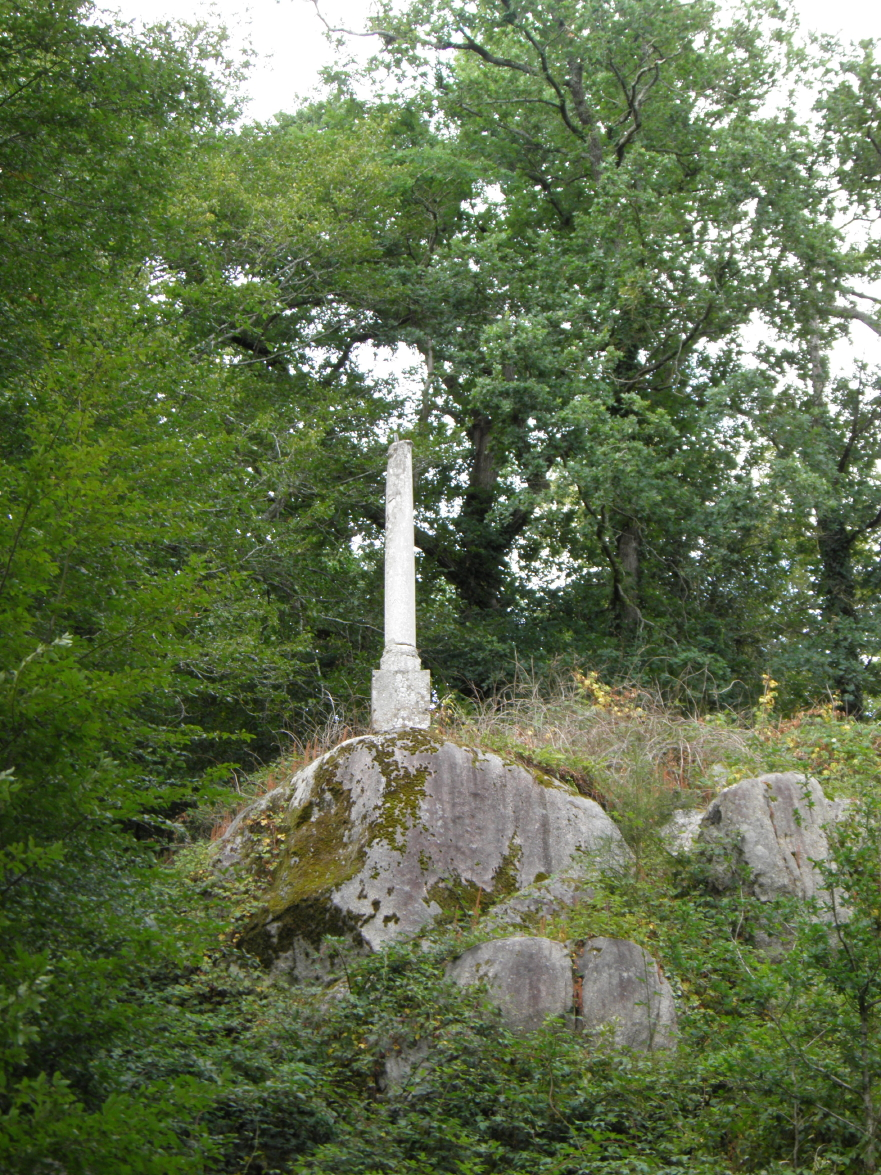
Madrid Column.

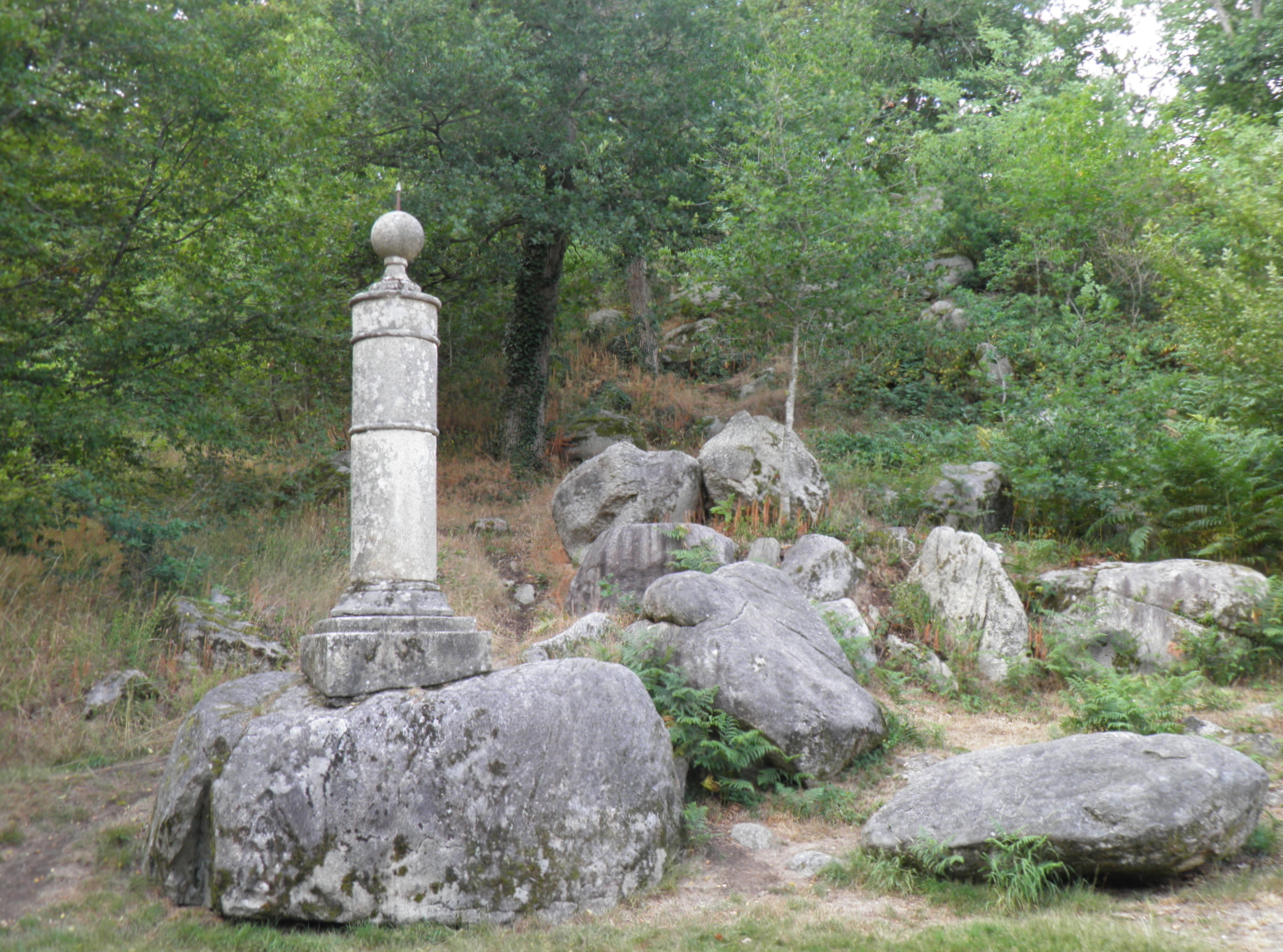
Milestone.

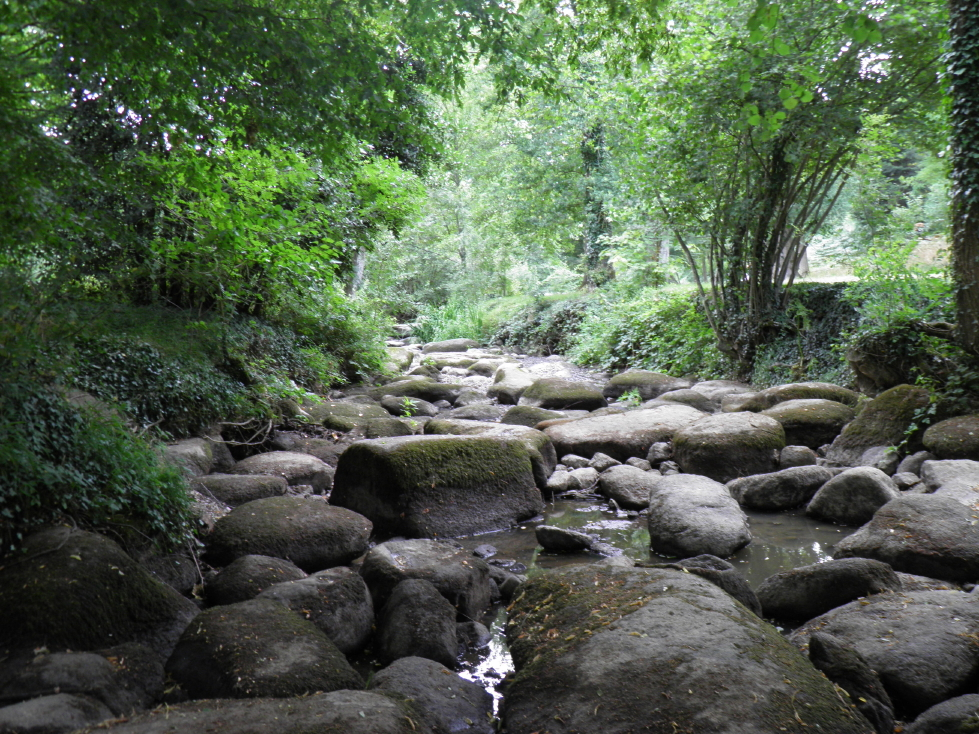
Baths of Diana.

The Plessard Mill was purchased by François-Frédéric Lemot in 1823, who left it in its original state, straddling the river. It was rebuilt in the Italian style between 1851 and 1854 by his son and Paul Méchinaud, a local architect. The building was further expanded in 1901.

== Garden features on the opposite bank of the Sèvre ==
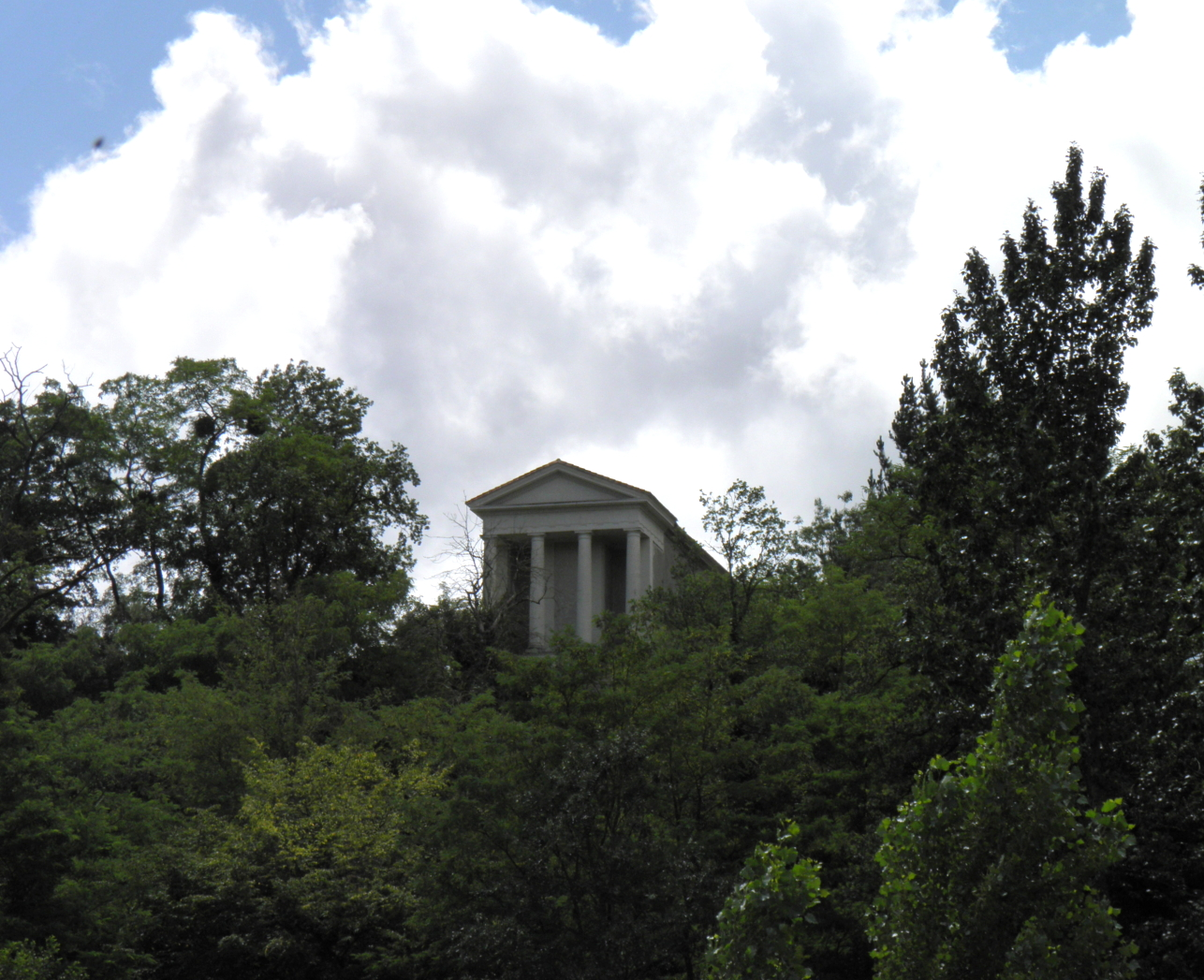
The Temple of Friendship, located in the Clisson cemetery, on the other side of the valley

The park, due to the orientation of the slope, is entirely focused toward the opposite bank of the Sèvre: this left bank was therefore a privileged location for installing other fabriques to correspond with the estate's perspectives.

The obelisk, designed by Crucy, was originally intended to be placed within the grounds of the Château de Clisson. It was the Nantes architect who convinced François-Frédéric Lemot to install it on the other side of the park, still on the opposite bank, to enhance the perspective. Once the land in the commune of Cugand, in Vendée, was acquired in 1814, the structure was built in 1815 with proportions allowing it to be visible from the villa.

The Temple of Friendship is a former funerary chapel called "Saint-Gilles Church" located in the Clisson cemetery. François-Frédéric Lemot acquired it in 1808 and in 1812 added a Doric portico to the facade facing the valley and the estate's villa. The goal was to transform it into a temple intended to house the remains of the Cacault brothers. It was completed only in 1824. Ultimately, only François-Frédéric Lemot was buried there upon his death in 1827.

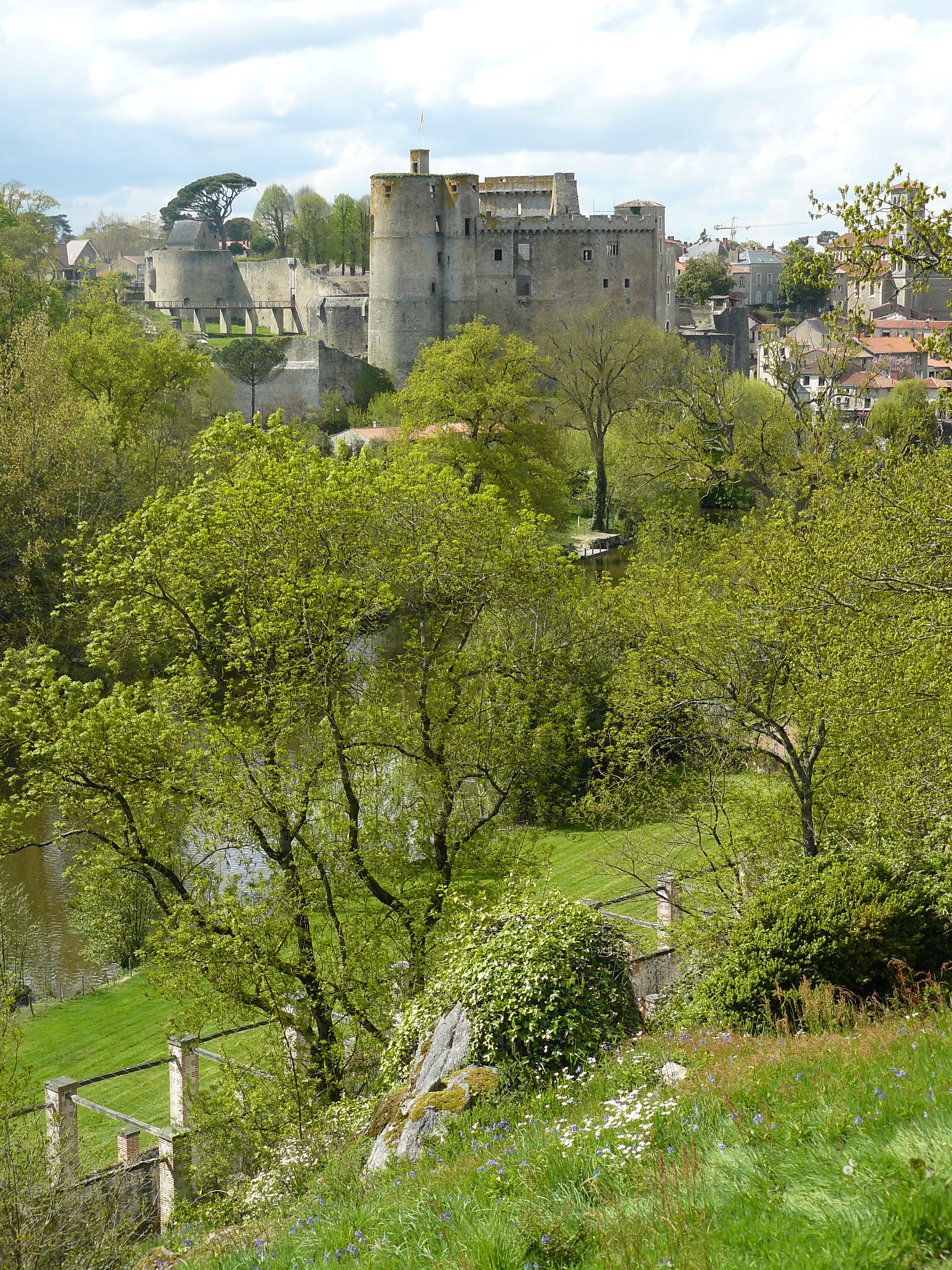
Château de Clisson seen from La Garenne Lemot.

The Henri IV Column is a column topped with a bust of the King of France. It is one of the last fabriques created by François-Frédéric Lemot, who likely sculpted the bust himself. He is also famous for sculpting the equestrian statue of the same king located on the Pont Neuf in Paris. The column is intended to provide a perspective from the villa's terrace and also symbolizes François-Frédéric Lemot's allegiance to the Restoration regime.

For François-Frédéric Lemot, the ruins of the Château de Clisson constitute a fabrique of the park in their own right. They can be observed by park visitors from the villa's terrace. For this reason, he acquired the ruins, consolidating rather than restoring them. This is one of the earliest examples in France of integrating picturesque medieval ruins into a fabrique park, a practice common in England since the early 18th century.

=== Contemporary features ===
Since the establishment of the Frac des Pays de la Loire at the estate between 1988 and 1994, La Garenne Lemot has been closely associated with contemporary art. Two fabriques designed by contemporary artists have been installed in the park, alongside the historic ones. The first is the work titled Pergola/Two-Way Mirror Bridge for Clisson, located on the banks of the Sèvre, in the eastern part of the park, created in 1989 by the American artist Dan Graham. He designed an installation specifically for this site, combining natural and artificial materials. It is a two-pane glass cabin protecting a small passage over a water feature, reflecting the surrounding park. The second fabrique is a work by Pascal Convert titled L'Appartement de l'artiste, located in the undergrowth near the villa. This small black marmorite structure was not designed for the park but during the artist's residency at the Villa Medici in 1990, while he was a fellow at the French Academy in Rome. Both works belong to the collection of the Frac des Pays de la Loire.

== Natural space ==
=== Landscaping ===
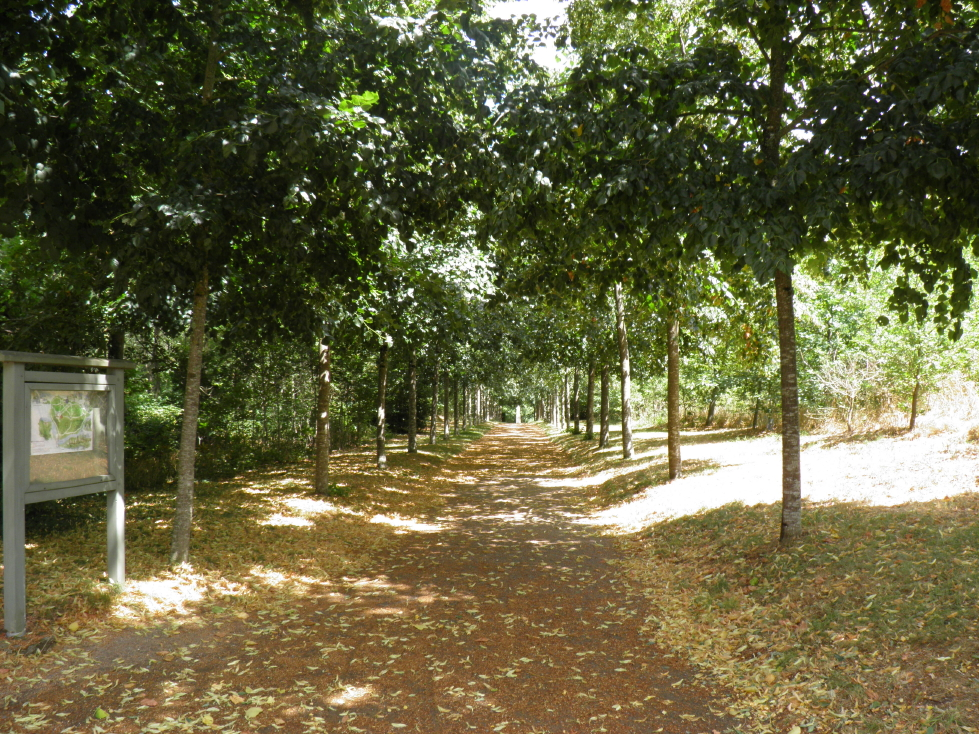
The avenue leading to the Diana roundabout at the villa's exit.

Beneath the appearance of wild and picturesque nature, the floral species were carefully selected at the beginning of the 19th century. The tree species were first chosen based on the recommendations of contemporary gardening treatises: acacia, alder, birch, chestnut, cedar, hornbeam, oak, spruce, maple, ash, yew, horse chestnut, larch, walnut, elm, poplar, plane tree, willow, linden, Japanese varnish tree, rowan, pear, and apple or wild cherry. François-Frédéric Lemot also selected pines to enhance the Italian landscape effect: maritime pine, stone pine, and Scots pine. Shrubs were added to increase the density of the groves: privet, holly, hazel, as well as lilacs, roses, and broom.

The garden itself is designed for strolling and contemplating viewpoints. Two main sections can be distinguished. The upper part of the park is organized into three main avenues, all converging toward the villa and its esplanade. The first heads west toward one of the park's entrances opposite the road to Cholet. At the center of the roundabout where it ends is the park's former icehouse. The second, aligned with the villa, leads to the vegetable garden, while the third, oriented northeast, ends at the Diana circus, at the center of which stands a statue of Faustina. The lower part of the park is organized from the entrance from the town of Clisson and the former Saint-Antoine hospital, where the gatekeeper's house is located. After passing under a trellis of virgin ivy, the avenue winds along the Sèvre valley through trees and thickets, alternating between open and enclosed spaces, while providing views of the main garden fabriques. It allows one to ascend to the Diana roundabout, passing by the easternmost fabrique of the park, the Temple of Vesta.

=== Management and restoration plan ===
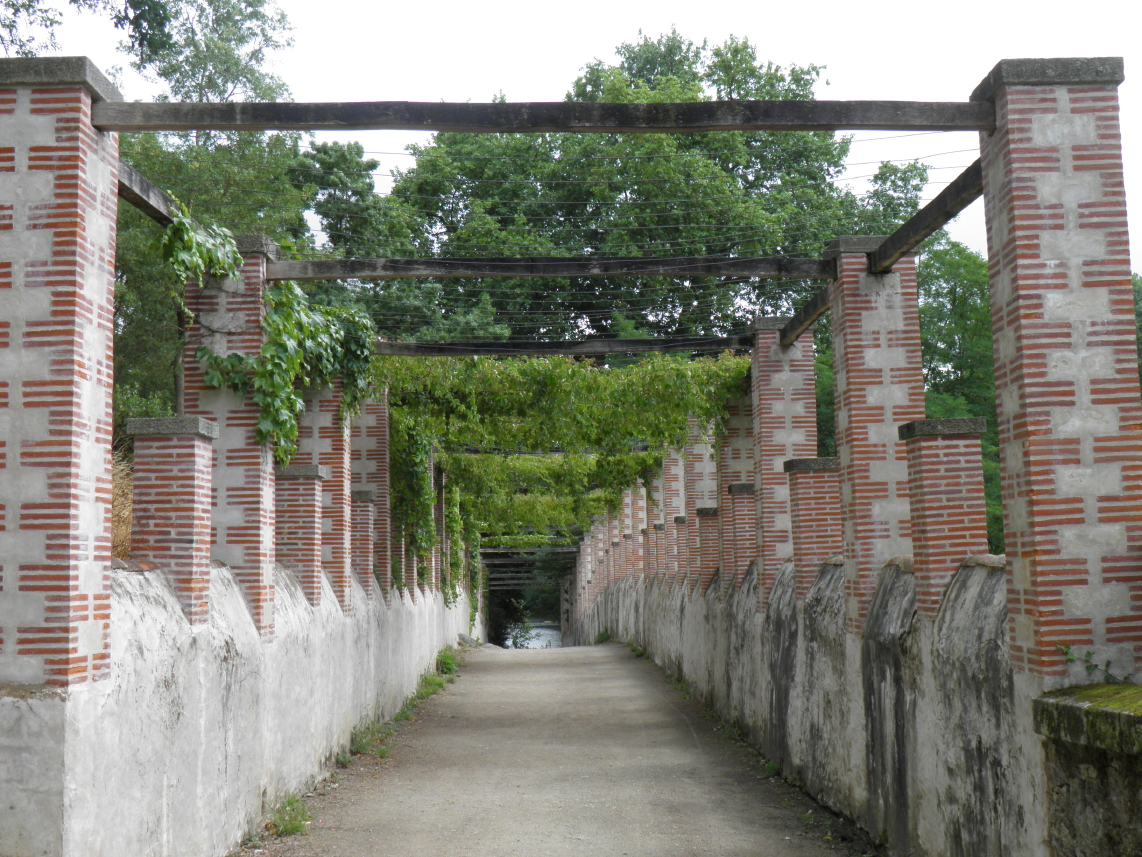
The trellis at the park's entrance following its restoration.

After various historical studies on the park, particularly through the examination of the correspondence between François-Frédéric Lemot and his estate manager, an initial restoration of the park began in 1992. In 1999, a study was launched to establish a park management plan, accompanied by a health assessment of the park. The objective of this plan is to implement dynamic conservation of the vegetal heritage through the establishment of a master plan for restoration, planting, and maintenance of the various spaces. This management plan was developed in collaboration with garden historian Elisabetta Cereghini and architect Vincent Lurton. It is one of the first management plans established in France for a historic garden, following that of the Château de la Roche-Courbon and concurrently with the Parc de Saint-Cloud. The new restoration work began in 2002 with the aim of restoring the picturesque atmospheres intended by François-Frédéric Lemot, while taking into account the park's evolution since the sculptor's death. The work aims to both preserve the park's vegetal heritage and contribute to its necessary renewal. External constraints such as climatic conditions and visitor traffic are taken into account. It is thus planned to plant conifers such as fir, Virginia juniper, thuja, as well as whitebeam, cherry, medlar, bay laurel, and flowering species: trumpet vine, clematis, daphne, Hydrangea sp., tamarisk, snowball viburnum, and jasmine. The selection of roses is based on varieties existing at the end of the 18th century and the beginning of the 19th century.

=== Natural area ===
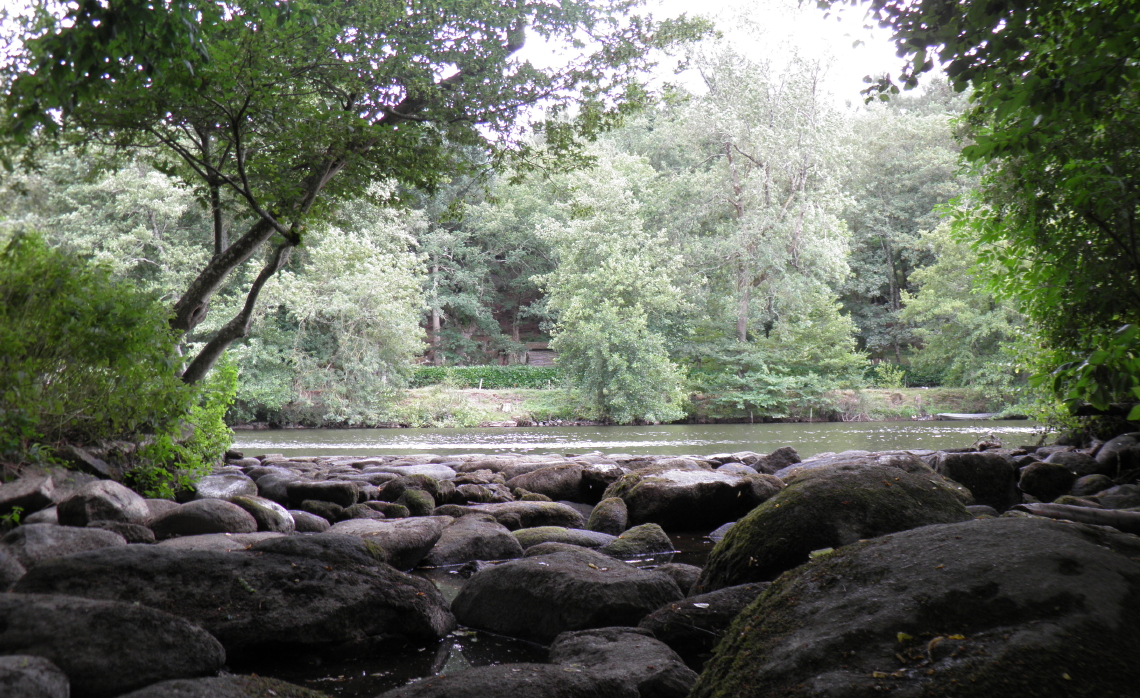
The banks of the Sèvre seen from the Baths of Diana.

The estate is included in the Zone naturelle d'intérêt écologique, faunistique et floristique (ZNIEFF) type 2 (2nd generation) "Vallée de la Sèvre de Nantes à Clisson," of which it forms the southern end. This ZNIEFF, whose inventory began in 1989 and was completed in 2005, includes significant natural habitats composed, in addition to the river's running waters, of deciduous forests, alluvial thickets, and waterside vegetation. In these environments, the presence of three protected fauna species and four rare or threatened specimens, as well as seven protected flora species and seventeen rare or threatened specimens, has been recorded.

The rare and protected fauna specimens are three fish species: the river lamprey (Lampetra fluviatilis), the European eel (Anguilla anguilla), and the northern pike (Esox lucius), as well as one snake species: the viperine snake (Natrix maura). Among the significant flora specimens, there is one fern, the common adder's-tongue (Ophioglossum vulgatum), seven monocotyledons: the starved sedge (Carex depauperata), the green-winged orchid (Coeloglossum viride), the great wood-rush (Luzula sylvatica), the bug orchid (Orchis coriophora), the loose-flowered orchid (Orchis laxiflora), the burnt orchid (Orchis ustulata), the triangular club-rush (Schoenoplectus triqueter), and eight dicotyledons: the estuary angelica (Angelica heterocarpa), the narrow-leaved bittercress (Cardamine impatiens), the soft hornwort (Ceratophyllum submersum), the solid-tubered corydalis (Corydalis solida), the false rue-anemone (Isopyrum thalictroides), the wood forget-me-not (Myosotis sylvatica), the ivy broomrape (Orobanche hederae), and the thyme-leaved speedwell (Veronica acinifolia).

== Cultural center ==
Each year, the Villa Lemot hosts exhibitions of contemporary art. As part of an exchange program with the French Academy of Fine Arts, the estate has hosted an annual exhibition since 1993 showcasing the work of artists in residence at the Casa de Velázquez in Madrid, a residency organized in partnership with the Academy. After two years of residency in Spain, young artists present their work in photography, painting, video, and drawing at the villa each year.

Additionally, a new partnership has been established with the Frac des Pays de la Loire (which was housed at the site between 1988 and 1993) and the estate since 2006. Once a year, the FRAC organizes an exhibition of contemporary artists. The first exhibition was held in 2006 under the title "Chambre avec vues."

Since 1994, every October, the "Entretiens de la Garenne Lemot" are held: an international multidisciplinary colloquium primarily focused on the relationship between Antiquity and the 18th century. Organized by the association of the same name, the colloquium is directed by Jackie Pigeaud, a former professor at the University of Nantes. Its proceedings have been published in recent years by the Presses universitaires de Rennes. Topics addressed include the reading of the garden (1997), academies (1999), travel (2000), water (2002), the meeting of the arts (2005), metamorphoses (2006), mirrors (2008), the limit (2009), and the tree (2010).

A documentation center dedicated to art, architecture, and landscape is also available to the public, located in the gardener's house. During the warmer months, a cultural program is offered in the park: dance, performances, concerts, and open-air cinema are organized from May to September as part of a departmental program titled "Les beaux jours."

== See also ==
- Garden feature
- François-Frédéric Lemot
- Mathurin Crucy

== Bibliography ==
- Collectif (1990). Clisson ou le retour d'Italie [Clisson or the return from Italy]. Cahiers de l'Inventaire (in French). Imprimerie nationale. p. 301. ISBN 2-11-081071-8.
- Couapel, Jean-Jacques; Duflos, Anne (1996). Voyage Italien à Clisson et dans ses environs. Loire-Atlantique [Italian journey in Clisson and its surroundings. Loire-Atlantique]. Images du Patrimoine (in French). Nantes: Inventaire général - Association pour le développement de l'Inventaire général des Pays de la Loire. p. 48. ISBN 2-906344-53-2.
- de Berthou, Paul (1910). Clisson et ses monuments : étude historique et archéologique [Clisson and its monuments: historical and archaeological study] (in French). Nantes: Boutin et Cosso. p. 223.
- Évenou, Gwenaël; Raineau, Yannick (1999). Le patrimoine des communes de la Loire-Atlantique [The heritage of the communes of Loire-Atlantique] (in French). Vol. 1. Flohic Éditions. pp. 307–308. ISBN 2-84234-040-X.
- Lemot, François-Frédéric (1812). Notice historique sur la ville et le château de Clisson [Historical notice on the town and castle of Clisson] (in French). Paris: Imprimerie de Hocquet et compagnie. p. 110.
- Ballot, Jean-Christophe (2004). Diane: un mythe contemporain [Diana: a contemporary myth] (in French). creaphis editions. p. 61. ISBN 9782913610484.
