= Congregation of Our Lady of Calvary =

Benedictine religious congregation

The Congregation of Our Lady of Calvary (Daughters of Calvary, Filles du Calvaire, Calvairiennes) is a Roman Catholic Benedictine religious congregation, founded at Poitiers in 1617.

== Foundation ==
The founders were Antoniette d'Orléans-Longueville, assisted by the Capuchin Joseph Le Clerc du Tremblay. Antoinette became a widow in 1596, and entered the convent of the Feuillantines at Toulouse in 1599. After her profession she was commanded by the Pope to act as coadjutrix to the abbess of Fontevrault, and assist her in reforming her convent.

Here Antoinette met Tremblay, who became her director: he had just reformed the monastery of l'Encloître, and when Pope Paul V ordered Antoinette to found a seminary for training religious, this convent was chosen for that purpose, and was soon filled with novices. In 1614 Antoinette founded and built a new convent at Poitiers, dedicated to Our Lady of Calvary, which became the cradle of the congregation.

By permission of the Pope, she left Fontevrault to enter this monastery, and took with her those nuns who wished to follow the Benedictine rule in all its strictness. The abbess of Fontevrault at first consented to this, but afterwards objected, and it was not until Antoinette's death that Tremblay established the new congregation, gave them constitutions, and got Pope Gregory XV to issue a Bull erecting them into an independent congregation under the title of Our Lady of Calvary.

== Later history ==
They were finally approved by the Holy See, 17 January 1827. The congregation succumbed to the French Revolution, but was restored afterwards and in 1860 had twenty houses in France.

The Paris Métro station Filles du Calvaire takes its name from an old Paris convent.

== See also ==
- Rue du Calvaire
