= Mathurin Crucy =

French architect and urban planner

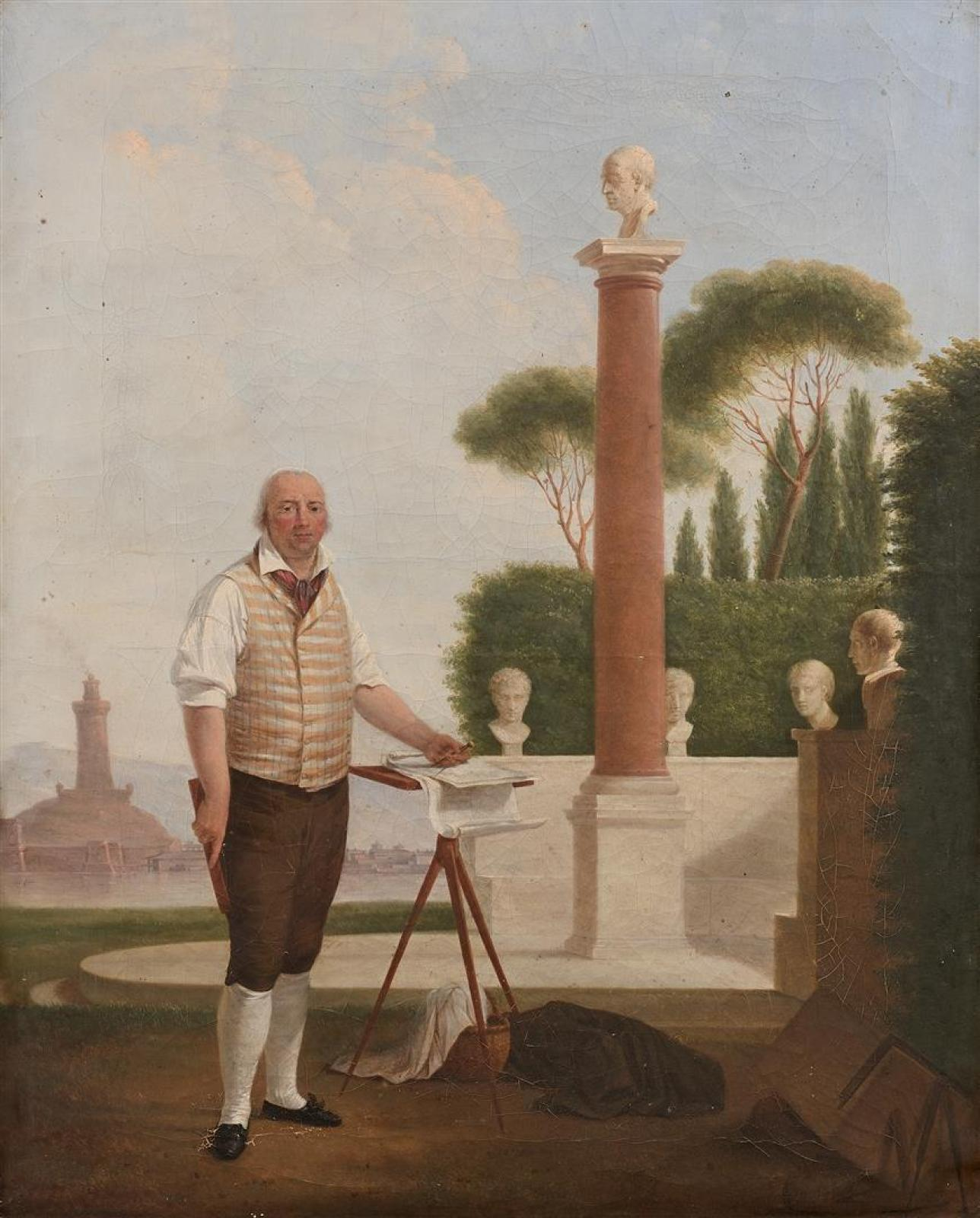
- Portrait de Mathurin Crucy, par Jacques Sablet.
- Born: 22 February 1749; Nantes
- Died: 7 November 1826 (aged 77)
- Occupation: Architect

Signature
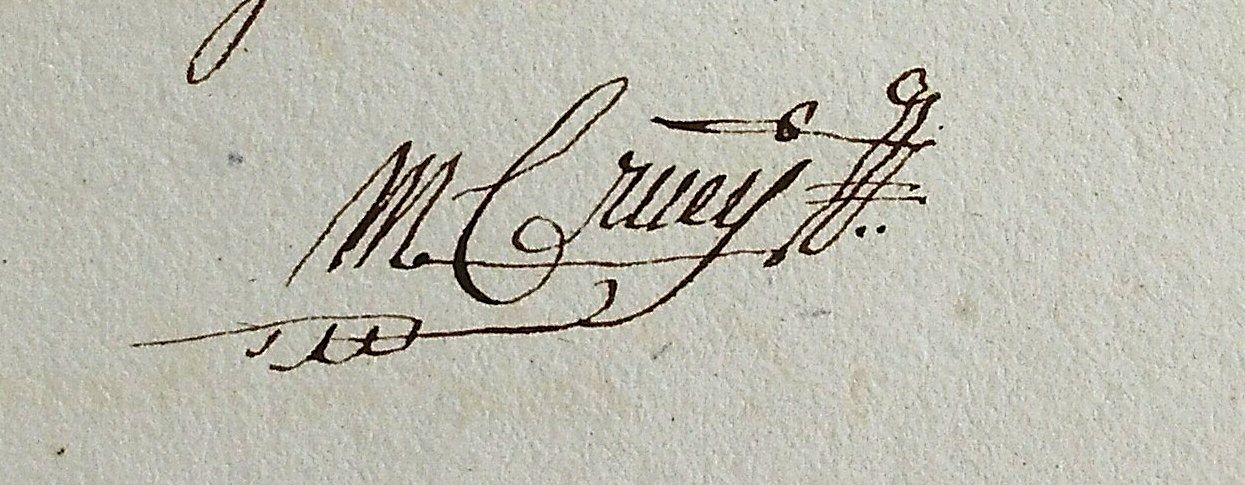

Mathurin Crucy (French pronunciation: [matyʁɛ̃ kʁysi]; 22 February 1749, Nantes - 7 November 1826, Chantenay, near Nantes) was a French architect and urban planner, who conceived a major Neo-Classical architectural programme for Nantes.

== Life ==
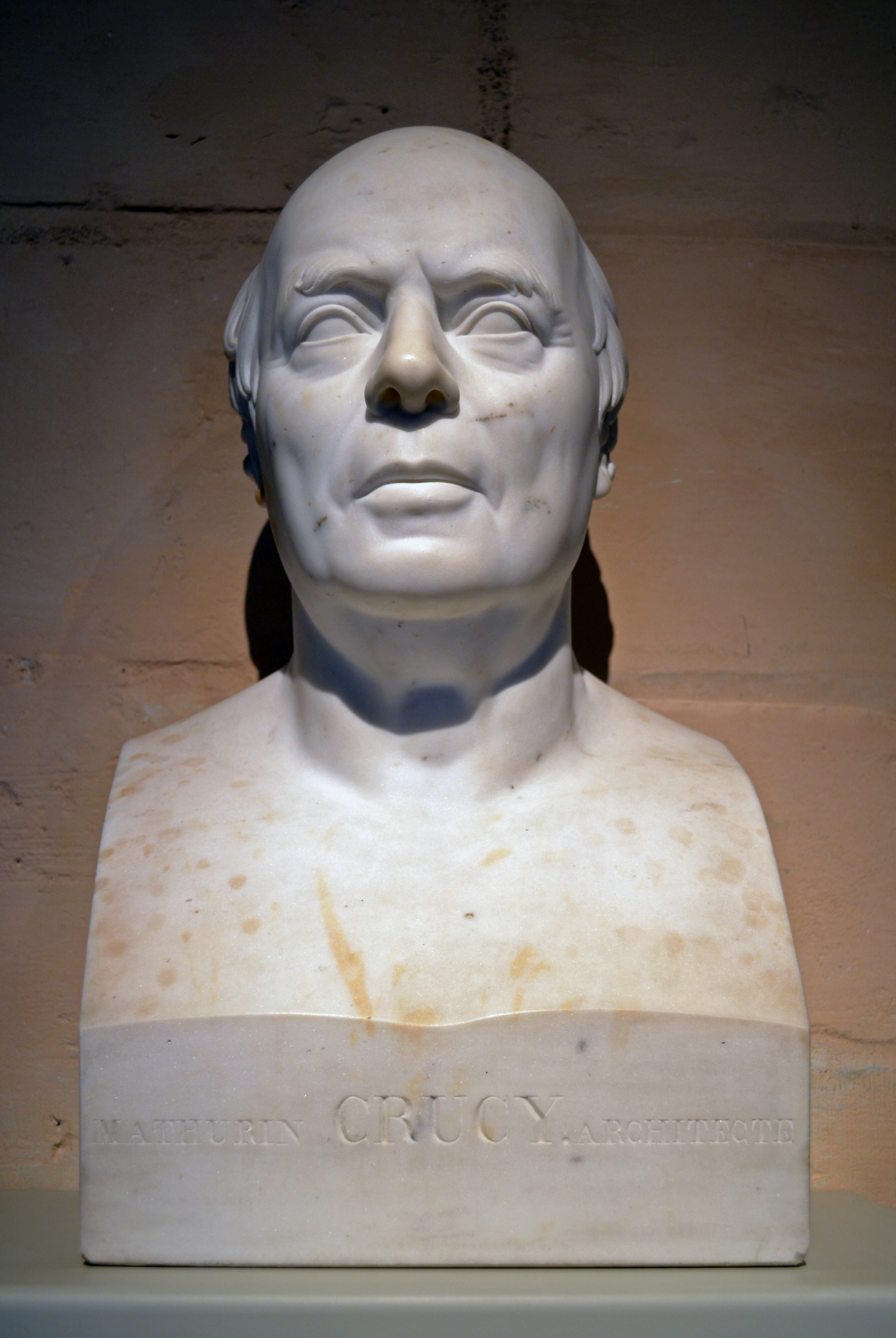
Bust by Jean de Bay, fils

The son of a lumber contractor, Crucy trained as an architect in Nantes in the studio of Jean-Baptiste Ceineray. With his help, he went to Paris and met the architect Étienne-Louis Boullée and the painter Joseph-Marie Vien. These contacts helped him to join the Académie royale d'architecture in 1771. He won the first Academy Award in 1774, later called the Prix de Rome, for his plan for a public spa-water bath. This allowed him to make a living in Italy for four years. At the Villa Medici, he met the painter Jacques-Louis David. He became deeply influenced by the villas of the architect Andrea Palladio.

He returned to Nantes in 1779 and succeeded Ceineray as overseer of the town architecture in 1780. He was responsible for the management of large urban developments underway at the time, including the transformation of the districts of Graslin and la Bourse. He originated the planning of Place Graslin and designed the Théâtre Graslin and Palais de la Bourse.

During the French Revolution he sought to protect important monuments from destruction by revolutionary extremists. He saved the tomb of Duke Francis II of Brittany and Marguerite de Foix during the destruction of the Carmelite church in the ducal parish in 1793. The tomb was later re-erected in Nantes cathedral.

He resigned in 1800 to devote himself to the family business, a naval shipyard, with his brother Louis. The business was growing because of the wars with England. His company, based in Basse-Indre, built frigates for the Napoleonic fleet, but it went bankrupt in 1808 and he completely abandoned this activity in 1810. He was appointed architect of the department of Loire-inférieure in 1809.

In 1808, he was asked by the sculptor François-Frédéric Lemot (1771–1827) to create a landscaped area of Italian inspiration in the town of Gétigné (near Clisson). It is currently known as Domaine de la Garenne Lemot. He started building the park and built the maison du jardinier de la Garenne between 1811 and 1815, one of the masterpieces of architecture in the rustic Italian style in France. He quarrelled with Lemot in 1821 and never finished the project, which was left to his successor, Pierre-Louis Van Cleemputte.

His niece, Justine Crucy, married Louis-Prudent Douillard, an architect, in 1821 and in 1823, another niece, Zita Crucy, married Louis-Prudent's brother Constant, an architect too, who designed some of the hospitals of Loire-inférieure, notably St. Jacques General Hospital in Nantes, and the place du Sanitat in the same town. Justine and Zita were daughters to Louis Crucy (born 1756), Mathurin's brother. On the 4 October 1785, in the Saint Similien church in Nantes, Louis and Mathurin Crucy had themselves married sisters Le Roux, Françoise and Marie Françoise.

== Gallery ==
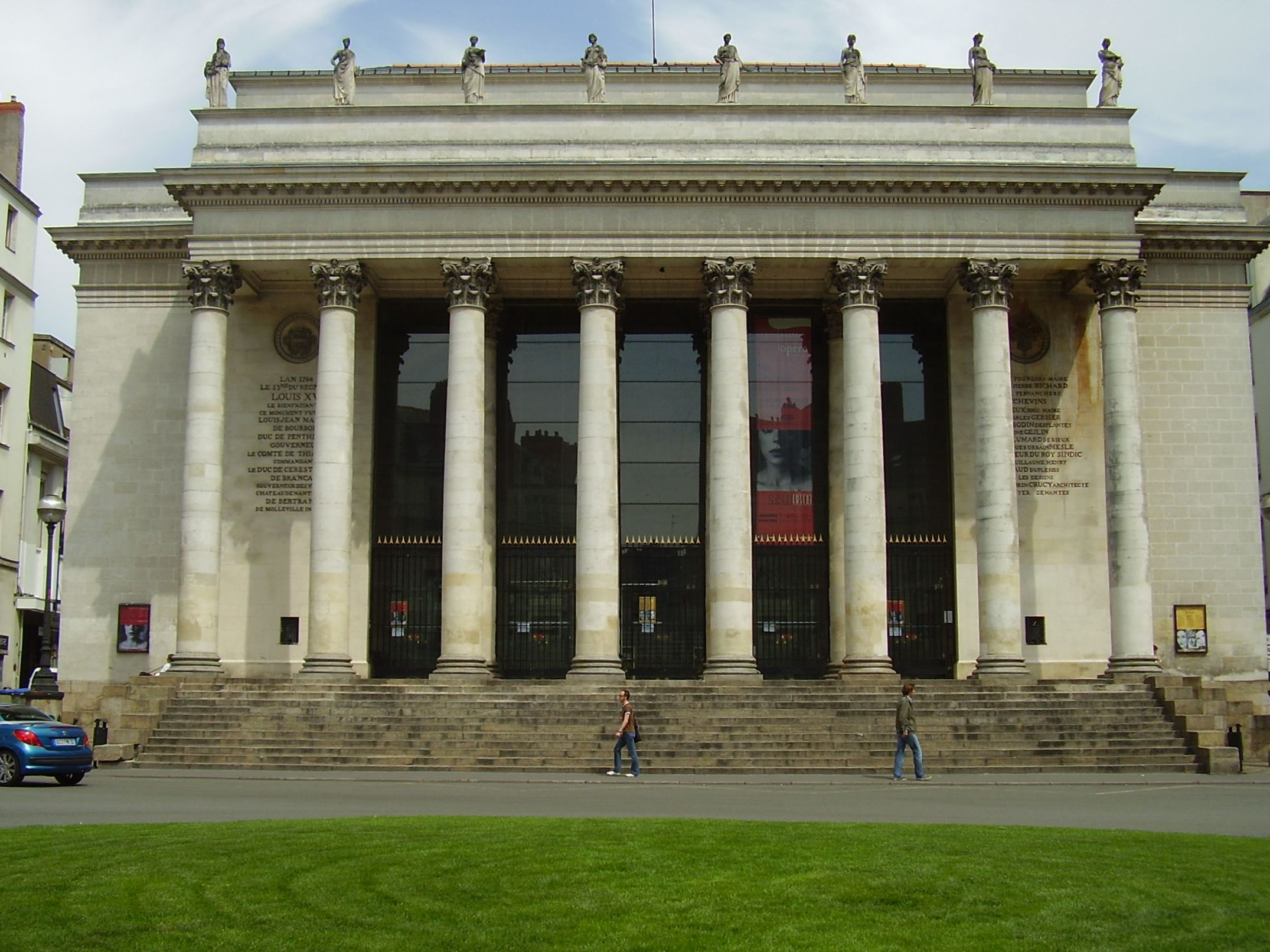
Théâtre Graslin, Nantes

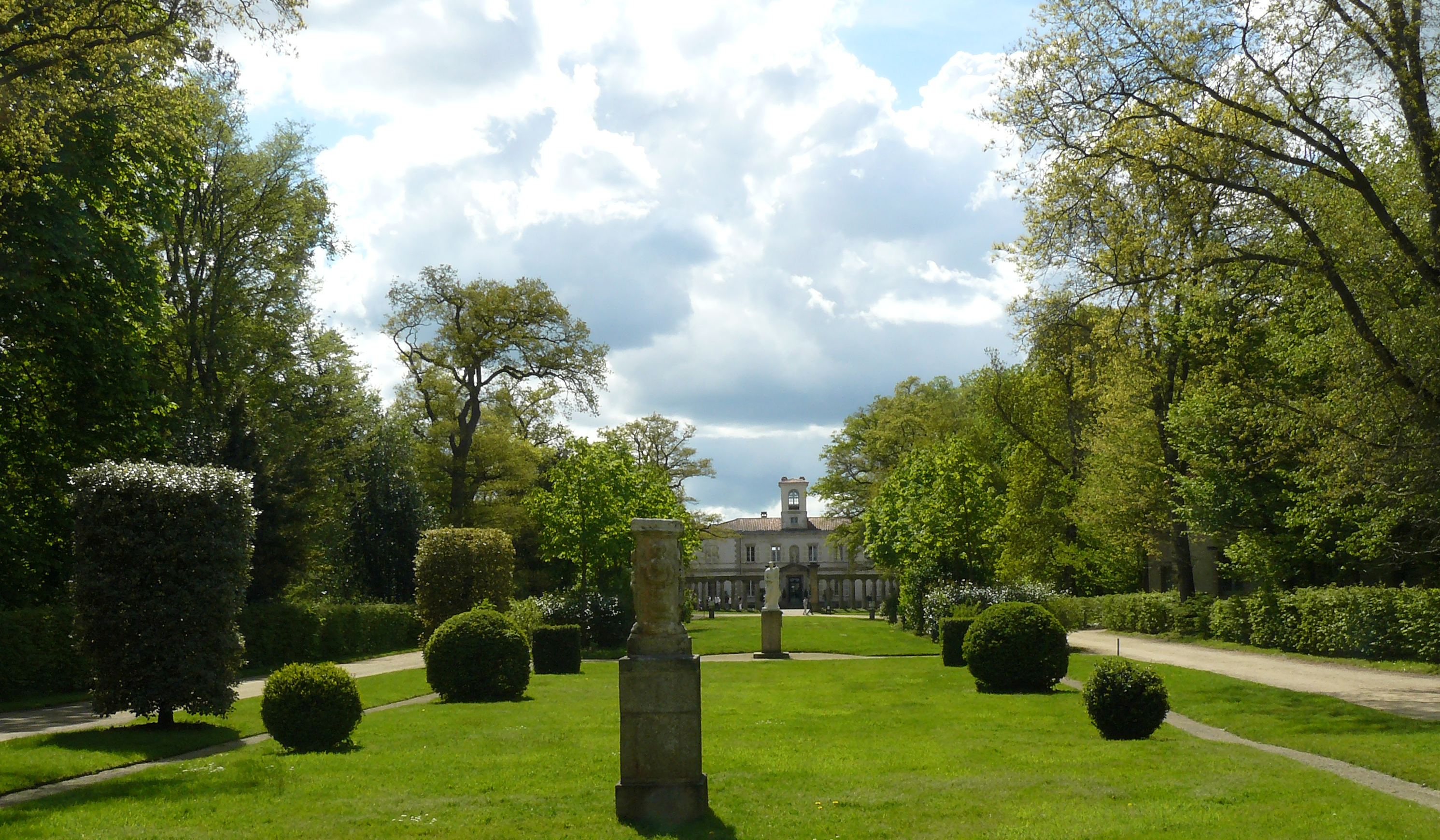
Garenne Lemot, Gétigné

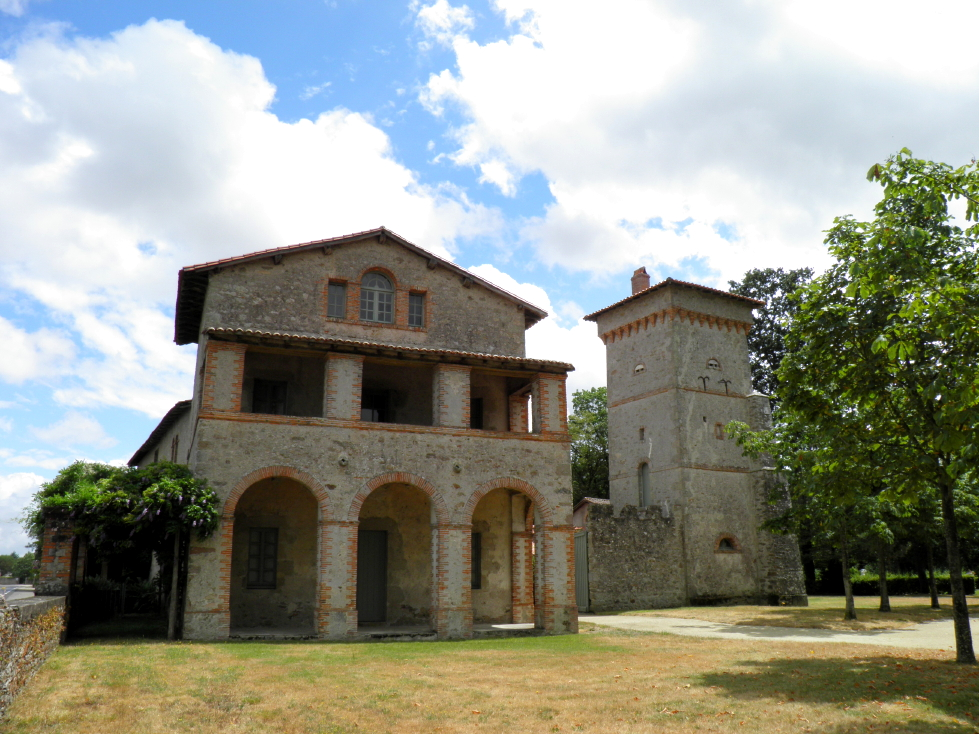
Maison du Jardinier

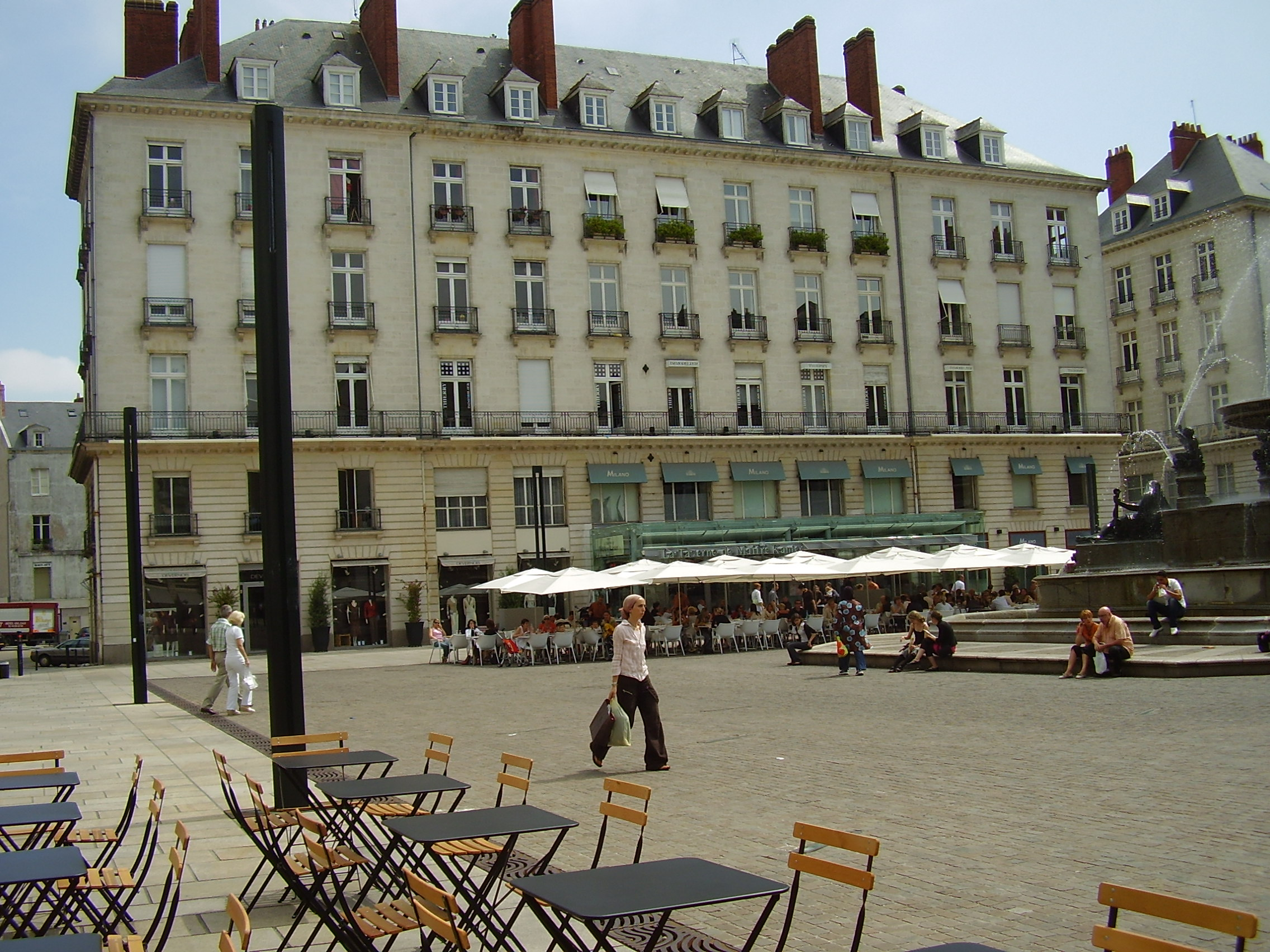
Place Royale, Nantes

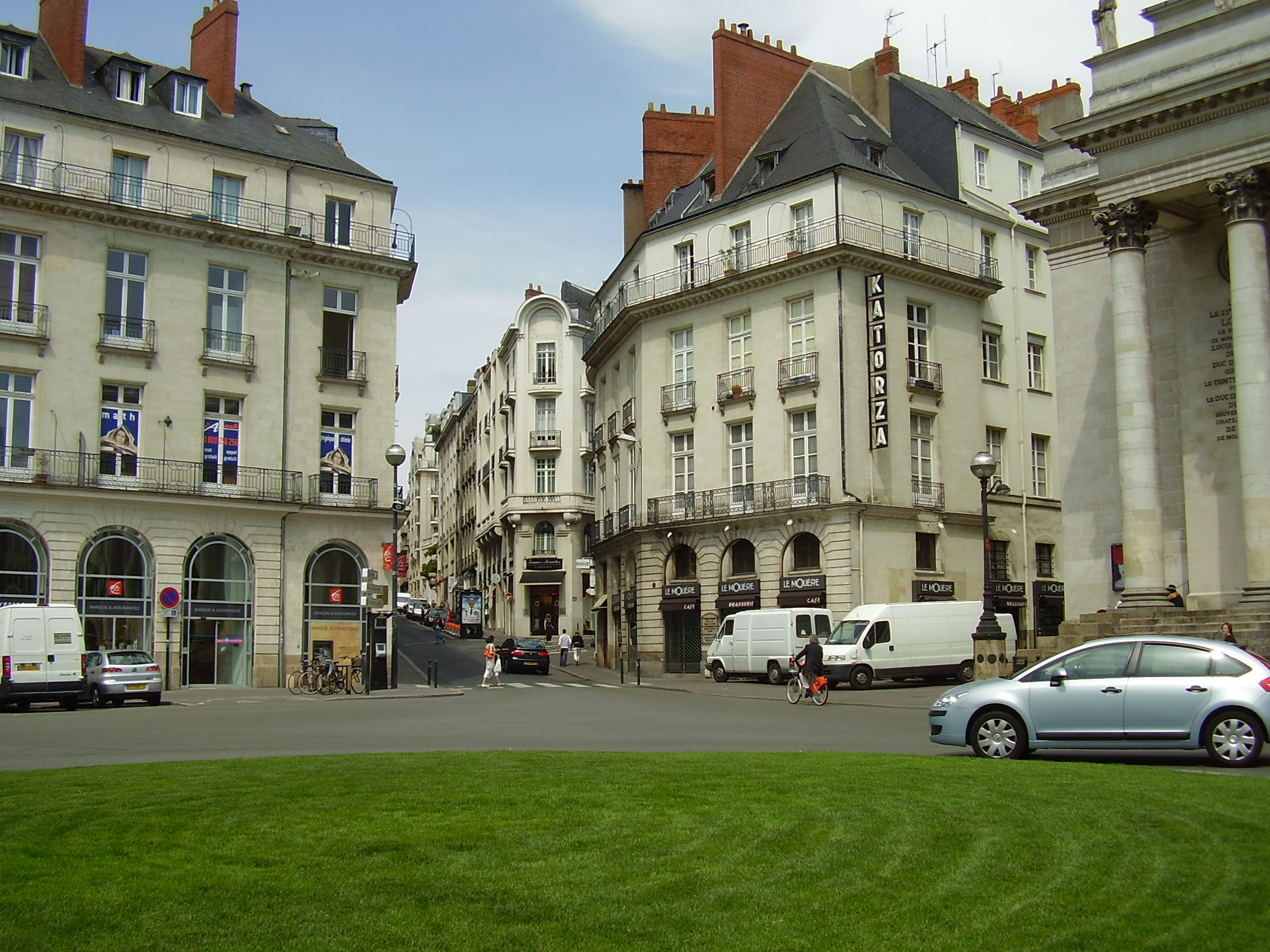
Place Graslin, Nantes

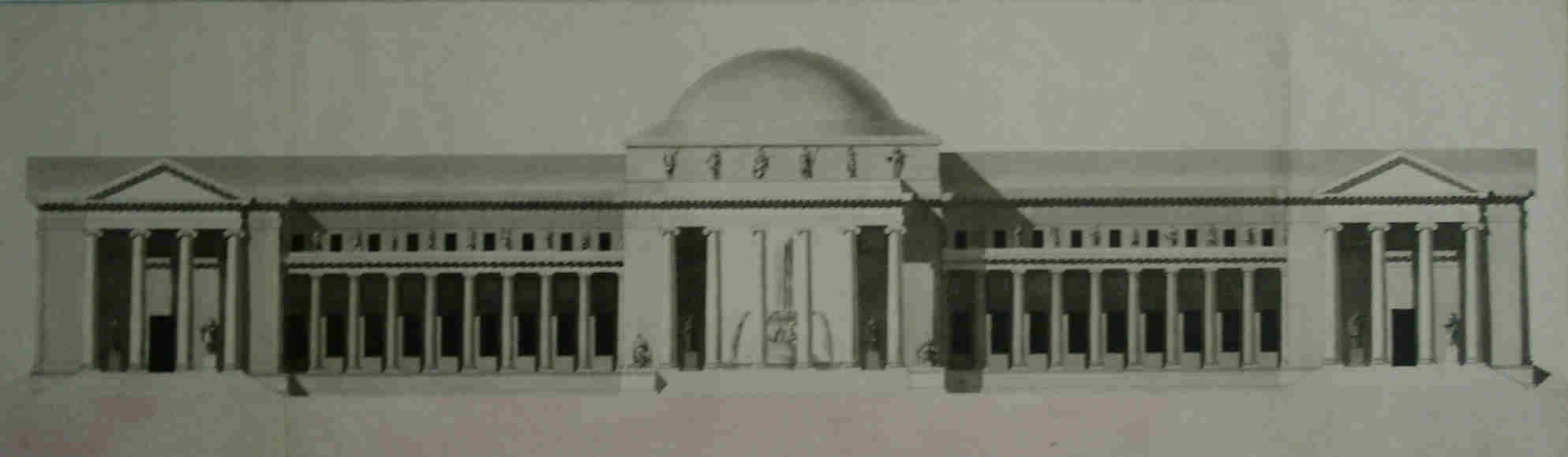
Design of a project for "public mineral water baths" for the Prix de Rome, 1774

== Main projects ==
- 1780–88 : Place Graslin
- 1783 : Hôtel de Montaudoin or Hôtel des Colonnes, on what is now Place du Maréchal-Foch
- 1784–88 : Théâtre Graslin at Nantes
- 1787 : Place Royale (destroyed in the Second World War and rebuilt more grandly on the same model)
- 1787 : Cathédrale de Rennes (built after the old building was demolished as it threatened to fall down)
- 1789 : Halle aux blés (demolished 1882)
- 1791 : Cours Cambronne (plans, completed during the 19th century)
- 1802 : Public baths (demolished) and west quays of the Île Feydeau
- 1807 : Halle aux poissons (demolished 1851)
- 1808 : Bourse du commerce, Nantes
- 1811–15 : Maison du jardinier du domaine de la Garenne Lemot, communes of Gétigné and Cugand, near Clisson
- 1818–23 : Garden structures in the Garenne-Lemot (temple of friendship, column, obelisk)
- 1816 : start of works on the house of the master of the Garenne-Lemot, to plans by Crucy (abandoned in 1823)

== Notes ==
=== Bibliography ===
- (in French) Claude Cosneau, Mathurin Crucy, 1749–1826, architecte nantais néoclassique, exhibition catalogue, Musée Dobrée, Nantes, 1986, 154 p. Compte-rendu in Revue de l'art n°74, 1986
- (in French) Alain Delaval, Le Théâtre Graslin à Nantes, ed. Joca Seria
- (in French) E. Maillard, L'Art à Nantes au XIXe siècle, ed. Vier, 1891, pp. 182–183
- (in French) Daniel Rabreau, "Mathurin Crucy", Dictionnaire des architectes, ed. Encyclopaedia Universalis - Albin Michel, 1999, pp. 193–194

=== See also ===
- Théâtre Graslin
- Palais de la Bourse
- Rue du Calvaire
