= Rue du Calvaire =

French street

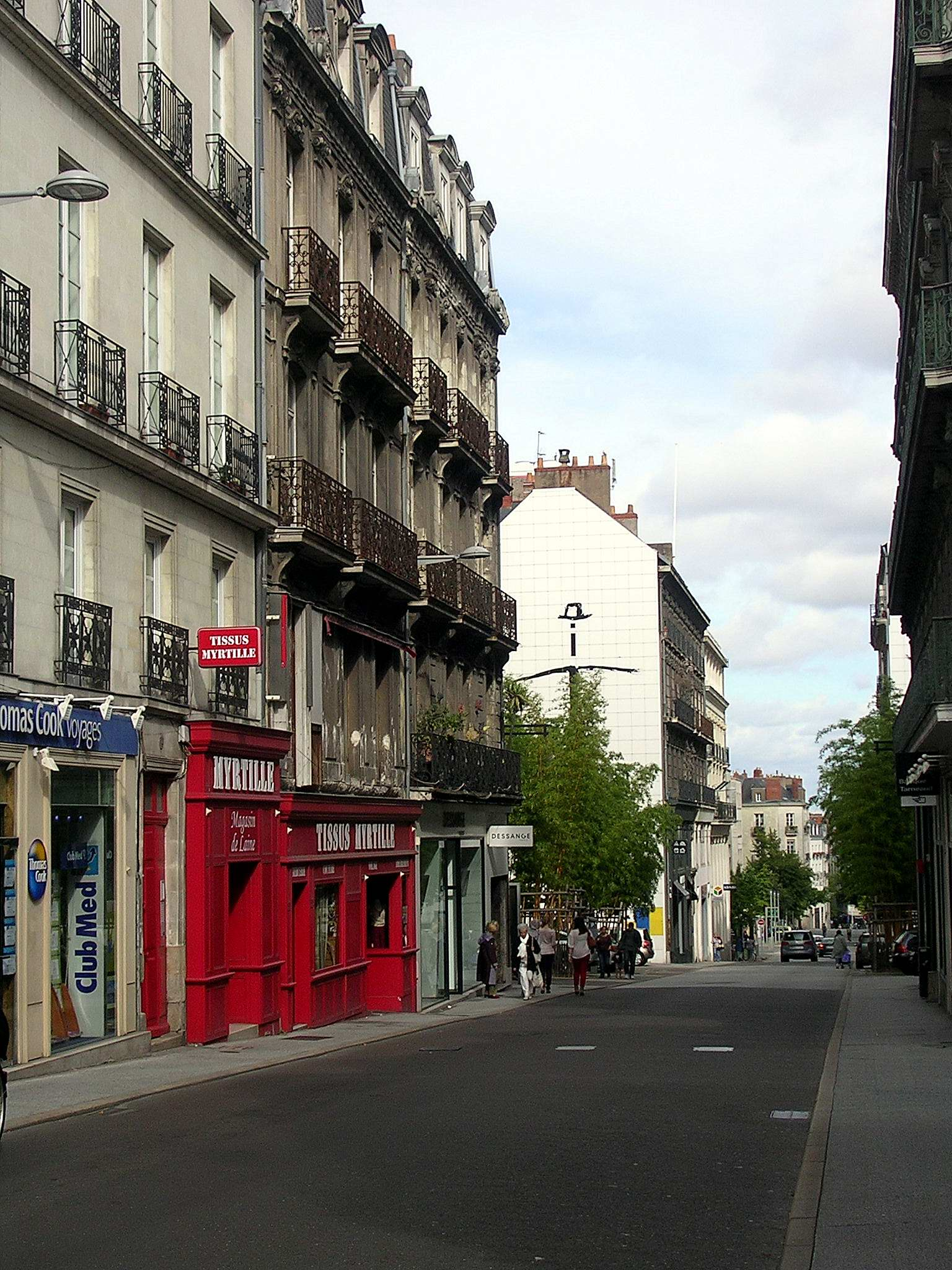
- View of the western (oldest) part of rue du Calvaire (photo taken at the level of Rue Lekain).
- Interactive map of Rue du Calvaire
- Former name: Rue Galilée
- Type: Street
- Location: Nantes, Pays de la Loire
- Coordinates: 47°12′56″N 1°33′40″W

Rue du Calvaire is a street in Nantes, France. Together with Place des Volontaires-de-la-Défense-Passive, located midway along its route, it represents an example of urban planning from the 1950s.

== Location and access ==
Rue du Calvaire is situated in the heart of Nantes. It extends Rue de Feltre, which begins at Cours des 50-Otages, and terminates at Place Delorme, continuing into Rue Copernic. Along its route, it intersects Rue Paré, Place des Volontaires-de-la-Défense-Passive, Rue du Chapeau-Rouge, and Rue Lekain.

It is one of the busiest semi-pedestrian shopping streets in Nantes, lined with numerous retail establishments (Zara, H&M, Armand Thiery, Monoprix, Undiz, Crazy Republic, Acessorize, etc.).

== Origin of the name ==
The street is named after the convent of the Lady of Calvary, which was located in its upper western section.

== History ==
The street, originally a path through land owned by the congregation of the Lady of Calvary since 1625, was planned for development in 1780 and constructed in 1788.

During the French Revolution, the street was renamed “Rue Galilée.” In 1793, the convent of the Lady of Calvary was converted into barracks and was sold in 1798.

The Hôtel Chardonneau, built in 1827 by architect François-Léonard Seheult and demolished in 1891, housed the Cercle des Beaux-Arts in 1835, followed by the “Grand Café du Sport.” A branch of the La Belle Jardinière store was later established on the site.

In 1843, the street was paved and connected to the quays of the Erdre with the opening of Rue de Feltre. In 1844, physician Benjamin Clemenceau, father of Georges Clemenceau, established his residence at number 8.

After the fall of Louis-Philippe I, political clubs were established in Nantes in early 1848 ahead of the first elections of the Second Republic. The “Société électorale de la place Sainte-Croix,” despite its name, was based on Rue du Calvaire and became known as the “club of Rue du Calvaire.” In March 1848, unlike the worker-based “Club de l’Oratoire,” the club of Rue du Calvaire represented liberal professions, with notable members including Évariste Colombel and Olivier de Sesmaisons.

During the Second Empire, Rue du Calvaire became a residential area for industrialists. In 1852, it was among the first streets in Nantes to be equipped with gas-powered street lamps.

During the Second World War, the neighborhood was largely destroyed during the Allied bombing of September 16, 1943, along with Place Royale and the adjoining Basilica of Saint-Nicolas. Only the buildings at the lower end of the street and those on Rue de Feltre survived. A few 19th-century buildings, initially slated for demolition under the 1949 redevelopment plan, were preserved by the municipality. After the war, architects Michel Roux-Spitz and Yves Liberge, responsible for the area, incorporated the street into the new traffic plan.

Reconstruction was used as an opportunity to significantly widen the street over about 160 meters, from Place des Volontaires-de-la-Défense-Passive to Place du Bon-Pasteur, expanding it from 9.5 meters to 25 meters wide: 11 meters for the roadway and 7 meters for each sidewalk.

Six identical concrete building blocks were constructed on either side of the roadway. Standing 23 meters high, they included a basement, a ground floor with a mezzanine (occupied by shops), and five upper floors, the last of which, set back with a terrace, was primarily used for offices. Various materials covered the façades: the base in reddish granite from Ille-et-Vilaine, the mezzanine in cladding stone panels, and the upper floors in dressed stone, thus continuing the architectural tradition of Nantes. Innovation came with the choice of openings, as Yves Liberge introduced to Nantes horizontal, metal, guillotine-style windows inspired by Roux-Spitz’s Parisian designs.

In 1960, Rue du Calvaire was used as an exterior filming location for Jacques Demy’s film Lola (1961).

Since autumn 2012, the section of Rue du Calvaire from Place des Volontaires-de-la-Défense-Passive has been designated a restricted traffic zone, allowing circulation only for cyclists, buses, emergency vehicles, and vehicles belonging to residents, shopkeepers, and delivery personnel.

== Notable buildings and landmarks ==
- At number 29, there is a late-18th-century building designed by the Nantes architect Mathurin Crucy.

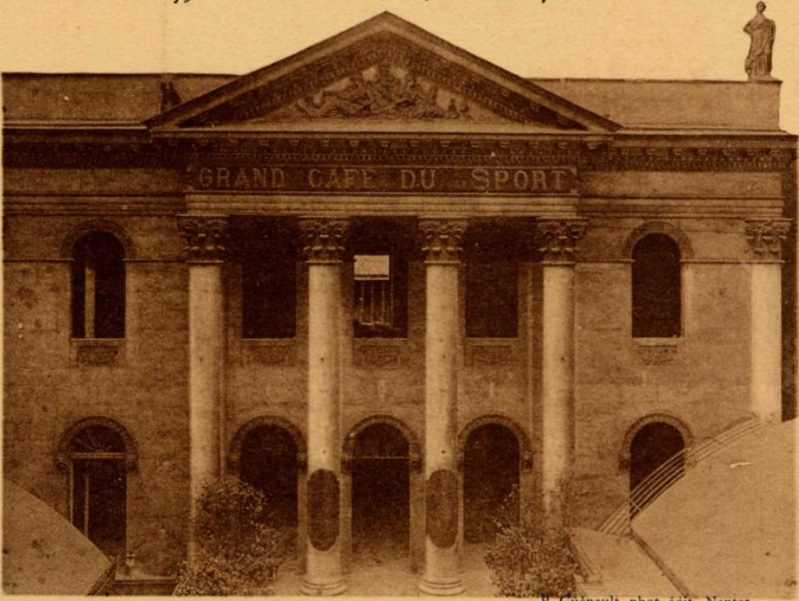
Café du Sport (former Chardonneau Hotel).

== See also ==
- Nantes

== Bibliography ==
- Aussel, Michel (2002). Nantes sous la monarchie de Juillet : 1830-1848 : du mouvement mutualiste aux doctrines politiques [Nantes under the July Monarchy: 1830-1848: from the mutualist movement to political doctrines] (in French). Nantes: Ouest éditions. ISBN 2-908261-78-2.
- Kahn, Claude; Landais, Jean (1992). Nantes et les Nantais sous le Second Empire [Nantes and the people of Nantes under the Second Empire] (in French). Nantes: Ouest éditions et Université inter-âges de Nantes. ISBN 2-908261-92-8.
- Pajot, Stéphane (2010). Nantes histoire de rues [Nantes street history] (in French). d'Orbestier. ISBN 978-2-84238-126-4.
- Pied, Édouard (1906). Notices sur les rues de Nantes [Notices on the streets of Nantes] (in French). p. 48.
