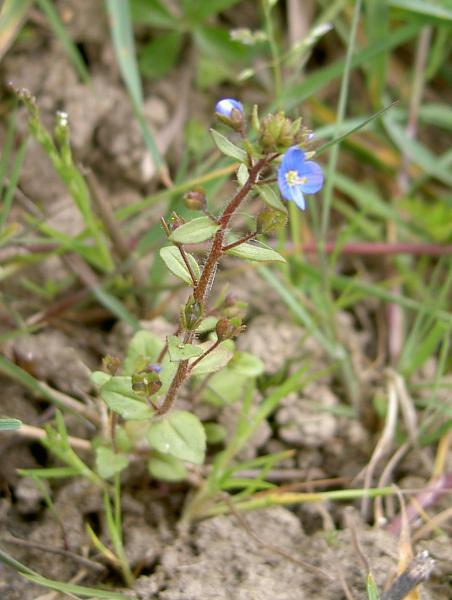

Scientific classification
- Kingdom: Plantae
- Clade: Tracheophytes
- Clade: Angiosperms
- Clade: Eudicots
- Clade: Asterids
- Order: Lamiales
- Family: Plantaginaceae
- Genus: Veronica
- Species: V. acinifolia

Binomial name
- Veronica acinifolia L.

= Veronica acinifolia =

Species of flowering plant in the plantain family

Veronica acinifolia, the French speedwell, is an annual flower in the family Plantaginaceae present within a band from Portugal to Britain on the west stretching eastwards far into Asia, with some gaps.

== Description ==
A small (to 15 cm or 5.9 in), annual, bright blue flowered speedwell with an upright stance, covered with glands, with small (to 1 cm or 0.4 in long), broadish leaves whose toothing is weak and blunt (or absent), the leaves becoming smaller upwards through the flowering section where they become small and narrower. The blue flowers are small (2–4 mm), and the fruit (2 x 3–4 mm) has two lobes separated deeply from the top.

Photographic examples can be seen on iNaturalist.

== Distribution and habitat ==
Its native range is Albania, Altay, Bulgaria, Corsica, Czechoslovakia, East Aegean Islands, Germany, Greece, Hungary, Italy, Kazakhstan, Kyrgyzstan, Crete, Crimea, Lebanon-Syria, Mongolia, Portugal, Romania, Spain, Switzerland, Turkey, Turkmenistan, Uzbekistan, Xinjiang, Yugoslavia, extinct in Belgium, and introduced into the British Isles.

Its habitat is cultivated ground, damp grassland, ditches, damp paths, in Turkey from 0 to 200 m (660 ft).
