= Colette Guillaumin =

French sociologist (1934–2017)

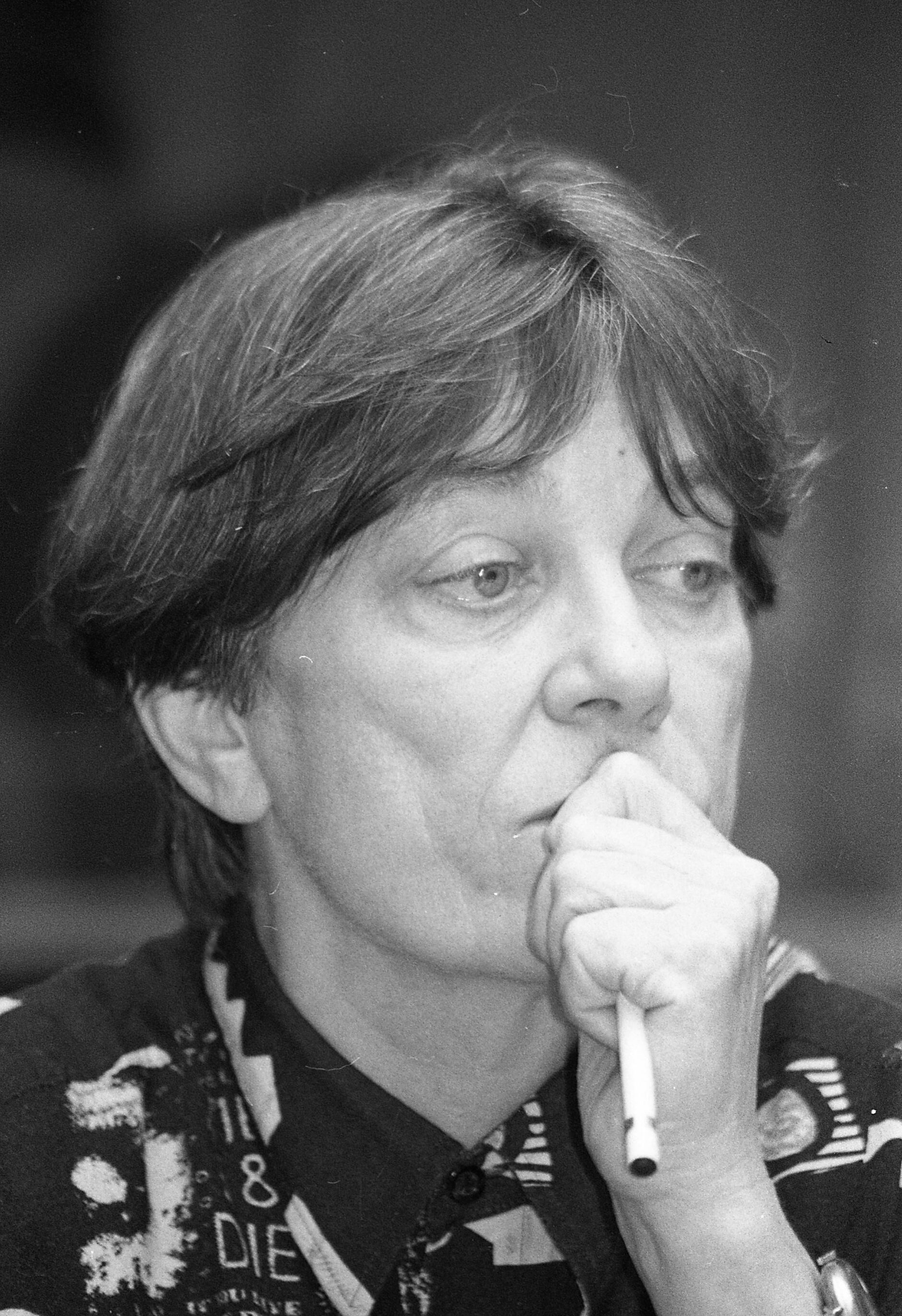
Colette Guillaumin, photographed by Nicole Décuré

Colette Guillaumin (28 January 1934 – 10 May 2017), was a sociologist at the French National Centre for Scientific Research and a French feminist. Guillaumin is an important theorist of the mechanisms of racism and sexism, and relations of domination. She is also an important figure in materialist feminism.

She participated in the founding of the journal Questions féministes, alongside other French academics (such as Simone de Beauvoir) and is also one of the co-founders of the journal Le Genre Humain.

Guillaumin was influential in the early academic field of the social construction of gender. Her theories overlap with those of radical feminists and lay the groundwork for gender criticism.

== Biography ==
Colette Guillaumin was born on 28 January 1934 in Thiers. She studied ethnology and psychology in Paris. She taught sporadically in France and Canada. She joined the Centre national de la recherche scientifique in 1959, initially as a technician and then from 1962 onwards as a researcher. In 1969, she defended her thesis Un aspect de l'altérité sociale. L'idéologie raciste, which was supervised by Roger Bastide. Guillaumin became a doctor in sociology at the centre in 1969.

Between 1969 and 1972, she participated in the Laboratoire de sociologie de la dominance with Nicole-Claude Mathieu, Colette Capitan and Jacques Jenny.

She first did research on racism: following Frantz Fanon, she emphasized the inferiorization of non-whites and the hierarchization of people according to their biological characteristics. She was one of the first in the study of racism to argue that the notion of "race" has no scientific value, does not refer to any natural reality and is an arbitrary mode of classification. She worked in particular to dismantle the naturalizing and essentialist discourses that legitimize discrimination.

In 1972, the results of her thesis were published by Mouton under the title L'Idéologie raciste, genèse et langage actuel (Racist ideology, genesis and current language), a work that was reissued in 2002 by Gallimard. In it, Guillaumin analyzes racism as a social fact, and develops the concept of racization as mentioned in previous studies. According to Naudier and Soriano, this book (her only work, but which also represents the heart of her thinking) should have marked the history of the emergence of studies on the social relations of race in France, but this turning point did not take place.

By the end of the 1960s, Guillaumin was already interested in feminism. In 1972, analogies between the notions of race and sex were found in L'idéologie raciste. Guillaumin was part of the group of feminists who had been working on the issue for many years. As part of this, herself and others founded the journal Questions féministes in 1977 (although she was not on the editorial board that inaugurated the journal), which was the source and publication organ of materialist feminism. During this time, she worked with Christine Delphy, Monique Wittig, Nicole-Claude Mathieu, Paola Tabet, Monique Plaza and Emmanuèle de Lesseps. In 1978, she published Pratique du pouvoir et idée de nature (in two parts), which theorized the appropriation of women through material social relations and naturalist ideology. She draws parallels between racism and sexism, and gives the name "sexing" to the appropriation of one gender class by another. In this field, Guillaumin wrote several texts for the Mouvement contre le racisme et pour l'amitié entre les peuples (MRAP) and was involved in feminist groups following on from the May 1968 civil unrest.

In 1992, Sexe, Race et Pratique du pouvoir (Sex, Race and the Practice of Power) was published, which included articles published in the journals Sociologie et sociétés (University of Montreal) and Le Genre humain, which Guillaumin co-founded in 1981. She also wrote in the journal Sexe et race (University of Paris). The term "sexage" that she created was taken up by Michèle Causse, Danielle Juteau and Nicole Laurin, as well as by Jules Falquet.

She died on 10 May 2017 in Lyon.

== Theoretical contributions ==
=== Racisé ===
In her book L'idéologie raciste, genèse et langage actuel, Guillaumin was the first person to introduce the term Racisé, in order to describe the cultural and social processes likely to assign a person to a minority group according to what majority groups perceive of them (skin color, religion, sexuality, ...), regardless of what that person actually is. Discrimination often results from this assignment to a minority group.

When we retrace Guillaumin's steps, while she was studying psychology and ethnography at the Sorbonne in the 1950s, we understand her approach better. A few years after studying at the Sorbonne, she met Nicole-Claude Mathieu and Noelle Bisseret and contributed with them to the collective work entitled: La femme dans sa société. Son image dans différents milieux sociaux. It was also at this time that she became interested in race and racism and published on these subjects.

=== Sexage ===
For Guillaumin, it is in the relationships of domination and appropriation that we find the basis of racism. Pushing her reflection further, she extends the concept of racism to the relations of force that can exist between groups of dominants and dominated. For example, the relationships between colonizers and colonized, foreigners and nationals, but also men and women; this leads her to create the theory of sexage.

The notion of gendering refers to the social relationship by which the male class appropriates, dominates and exploits the female class. The relation of sexage differs from the relation of class in that it is based on a physical appropriation, that is, the class of men appropriates the bodies of the class of women as "[a] material unit producing labor power" and not only their labor power as is the case for proletarians. In a socio-political context where the analysis of the relations of exploitation is mainly based on Marxist theory, Guillaumin shows that the idea according to which "labor power is the ultimate thing one has to live on is inadequate for the entire class of women." The specificity of the exploitative relation that produces gender classes is that there is "no kind of measure to the monopolization of labor power [...]. The body is a reservoir of labor power, and it is as such that it is appropriated. It is not labor-power, as distinct from its carrier/producer insofar as it can be measured in 'quantities' (of time, money, tasks) that is appropriated, but its origin: the labor-power-machine." For example, in marriage, the private form of the appropriation relation, there are no limitations on the wife's employment in terms of time, tasks, number of children to be delivered, etc. The same is true of domestic work, which women still do overwhelmingly, and which cannot be measured: there is no "punch-in" or "punch-out", but rather a diversity of tasks that can arise at any moment and which require permanent availability.

The most particular expressions of the sexed relationship are: the appropriation of time, the appropriation of the products of the body, sexual obligation, the physical burden of the disabled members of the group (children, the elderly, the sick, the infirm) and the able-bodied members of the male sex.

== Bibliography ==
- Guillaumin, Colette (1995). Racism, sexism, power, and ideology. London: Routledge. ISBN 0-415-09385-6.
