= The Straight Mind and Other Essays =

1992 book by Monique Wittig

- Cover of the first edition
- Author: Monique Wittig
- Language: English
- Publisher: Beacon Press
- Publication date: 1992
- Publication place: United States
- Media type: Print

The Straight Mind and Other Essays is a 1992 collection of essays by Monique Wittig.

The collection was translated into French as La pensée straight in 2001. The title essay, "The Straight Mind", was delivered to the Modern Language Association annual convention in 1978, and makes reference to The Savage Mind by Claude Lévi-Strauss.

== Summary ==
The foreword by Louise Turcotte underscores Wittig’s profound impact on feminist theory, literature, and politics. Turcotte contrasts Wittig's radical lesbianism with lesbian separatism and calls the term compulsory heterosexuality redundant.

The first essay of the collection is "The Category of Sex". Wittig argues that the categories of "male" and "female" serve to mask the economic, political, and ideological power imbalances between men and women. She contends that oppression precedes and creates the idea of a biological sex, not the other way around, and that heterosexuality enforces women's subjugation through mechanisms like marriage, domestic labor, and forced reproduction. Wittig then calls for the abolition of the category of sex.

"One Is Not Born a Woman", delivered in September 1979 at the "30th Anniversary Conference of the Second Sex" held at New York University, takes up the outcomes of Simone de Beauvoir's feminist political visions for lesbians. Wittig critiques the "myth of womanhood" and emphasizes the need for women to recognize themselves as a class, resist their programmed roles, and forge individual subjectivity beyond the constraints of sex categories. Moreover, she compares lesbians to fugitive slaves.

"The Straight Mind" was delivered as the morning keynote address at Barnard College's event, "The Scholar and the Feminist Conference, The Future of Difference". Wittig writes "lesbians are not women" under the assumption that the term "woman" is defined by men. The essay appeared in French in Questions féministes, where the editorial collective, which included Wittig, splintered over "the lesbian question" leading to a dissolution of the collective and end to the publication. It also appeared in English in Feminist Issues.

"The Trojan Horse" explains her theory of literature as a "war machine", echoing Gilles Deleuze.

== Reception ==
In her review of the collection, Rosemary Hennessy highlights Wittig’s materialist critique of heterosexuality as a political regime. Hennessy contrasts Wittig’s approach with that of queer theory, arguing that while both challenge identity politics and the notion of stable sexual identities, queer theory primarily engages with sexuality as a discursive construct, often neglecting the broader material dimensions of oppression. Wittig, on the other hand, emphasizes how heterosexuality is not just a cultural discourse but a system of power and economic exploitation tied to capitalism and patriarchy.
