= Queer theory =

Field of critical theory

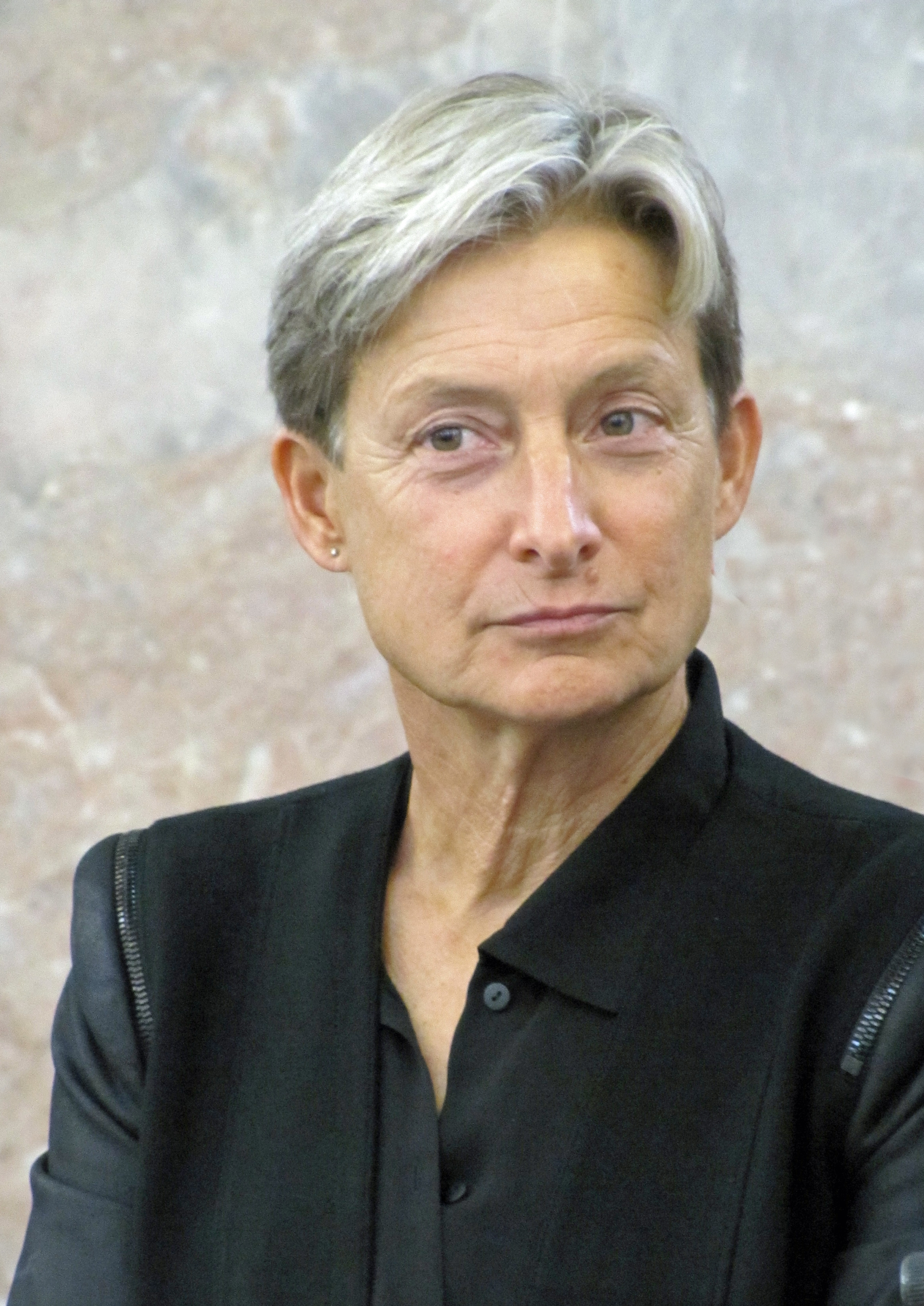
Judith Butler

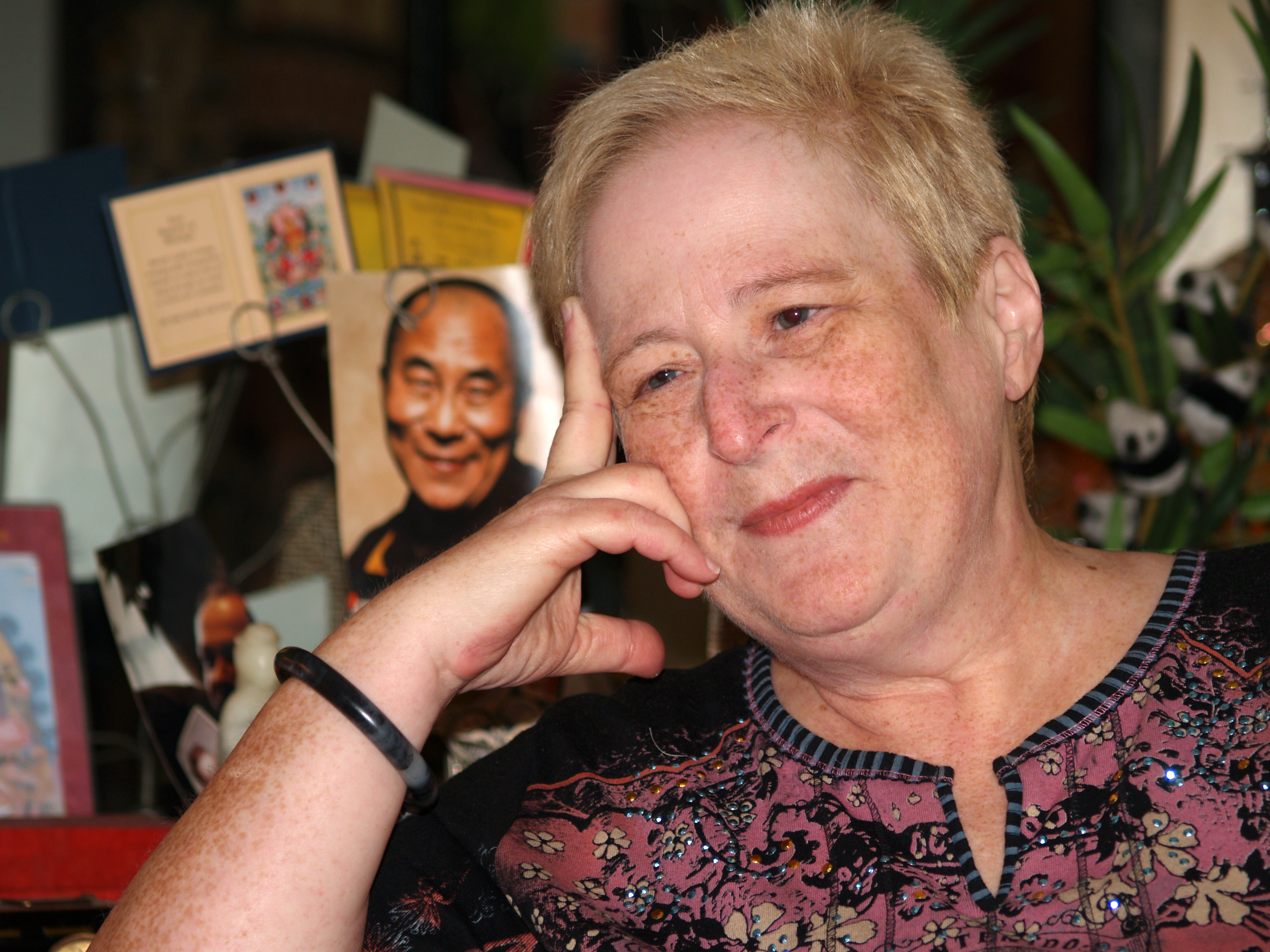
Eve Kosofsky Sedgwick

Queer theory is a field of post-structuralist critical theory which is broadly associated with the study and theorization of gender and sexual practices that exist outside heterosexuality, and which challenge heteronormativity. Following social constructionist developments in sociology, queer theorists are often critical of what they consider essentialist views of sexuality and gender. Instead, they study those concepts as social and cultural phenomena, often through an analysis of the categories, language, and binary oppositions in which they are portrayed.

It emerged in the early 1990s out of queer studies (formerly often known as gay and lesbian studies) and women's studies. As an academic discipline, queer theory itself was developed by American feminist scholars Judith Butler and Eve Kosofsky Sedgwick. Other scholars associated with the development of queer theory are French post-structuralist philosopher Michel Foucault, and Chicana feminist author Gloria Anzaldúa.

== History ==
Informal use of the term "queer theory" began with Gloria Anzaldúa and other scholars in the 1990s, themselves influenced by the work of French post-structuralist philosopher Michel Foucault, who viewed sexuality as socially constructed and rejected identity politics. Queer theory's roots can also be traced back to activism, with the reclaiming of the derogatory term "queer" as an umbrella term for those who do not identify with heteronormativity in the 1980s. This would continue on in the 1990s, with Queer Nation's use of "queer" in their protest chants, such as "We're here! We're queer! Get used to it!"

Teresa de Lauretis organized the first queer theory conference in 1990. In her words, "the work of the conference was intended to articulate the terms in which lesbian and gay sexualities may be understood and imaged as forms of resistance to cultural homogenization, counteracting dominant discourses with other constructions of the subject in culture."

According to David Halperin, an early queer theorist, de Lauretis' usage was somewhat controversial at first, as she chose to combine the word "queer" which was just starting to be used in a "gay-affirmative sense by activists, street kids, and members of the art world," and the word "theory" which was seen as very academically weighty. In the early 1990s, the term started to become legitimized in academia.

Queer Theory was developed by American academics Judith Butler at University of California, Berkeley, and Eve Kosofsky Sedgwick at Duke University into an academic discipline Other early queer theorists include Michael Warner, Lauren Berlant, and Adrienne Rich.

Feminist literary criticism laid groundwork by linking gender and textual interpretation. Foundational works like Sedgwick’s Epistemology of the Closet (1990) drew on literary and philosophical traditions to examine the homo/heterosexual binary. Sedgwick, D. A. Miller, Leo Bersani, and other queer literary critics have analyzed themes such as the closet, shame, and power in narratives.

== Definition ==
The term "queer" itself intentionally remains loosely defined in order to encompass the difficult-to-categorize spectrum of gender, sexuality and romantic attraction. Similarly, queer theory remains difficult to objectively define as academics from various disciplines have contributed varying understanding of the term. At its core, queer theory relates to queer people, their lived experience and how their lived experience is culturally or politically perceived, specifically referring to the marginalization of queer people. This thinking is then applied to various fields of thinking.

Queer theory and politics necessarily celebrate transgression in the form of visible difference from norms. These 'Norms' are then exposed to be norms, not natures or inevitabilities. Gender and sexual identities are seen, in much of this work, to be demonstrably defiant definitions and configurations.

— Jay Stewart

In an influential essay, Michael Warner argued that queerness is defined by what he called "heteronormativity"; those ideas, narratives and discourses which suggest that heterosexuality is the default, preferred, or normal mode of sexual orientation. Warner stated that while many thinkers had been theorising sexuality from a non-heterosexual perspective for perhaps a century, queerness represented a distinctive contribution to social theory for precisely this reason. Lauren Berlant and Warner further developed these ideas in their seminal essay, "Sex in Public".

According to Warner, critics such as Edward Carpenter, Guy Hocquenghem and Jeffrey Weeks had already emphasised the "necessity of thinking about sexuality as a field of power, as a historical mode of personality, and as the site of an often critical utopian aim". Whereas the terms "homosexual", "gay" or "lesbian" which they used signified particular identities with stable referents (i.e. to a certain cultural form, historical context, or political agenda whose meanings can be analysed sociologically), the word "queer" is instead defined in relation to a range of practices, behaviours and issues that have meaning only in their shared contrast to categories which are alleged to be "normal". Such a focus highlights the indebtedness of queer theory to the concept of normalisation found in the sociology of deviance, particularly through the work of Michel Foucault, who studied the normalisation of heterosexuality in his work The History of Sexuality.

Because this definition of queerness does not have a fixed reference point, Judith Butler has described the subject of queer theory as a site of "collective contestation". They suggest that "queer" as a term should never be "fully owned, but always and only redeployed, twisted, queered from a prior usage and in the direction of urgent and expanding political purposes". While proponents argue that this flexibility allows for the constant readjustment of queer theory to accommodate the experiences of people who face marginalisation and discrimination on account of their sexuality and gender, critics allege that such a "subjectless critique", as it is often called, runs the risk of abstracting cultural forms from their social structure, political organization, and historical context, reducing social theory to a mere "textual idealism".

Queer theory deals with the micro level (the identity of the individual person), the meso level (the individual in their immediate groups such as family, friends, and work), and the macro level (the larger context of society, culture, politics, policies and law). Accordingly, queer theory not only examines the communities surrounding the queer people, but also the communities they form. Same-sex living communities have a significant priority in the formation of a queer theory. The standard work of Andreas Frank, Committed Sensations, highlights comprehensively the life situation of coming out, homosexuality and same-sex communities to the millennium.

== Queer theory in philosophy ==
Fundamentally, queer theory does not construct or defend any particular identity, but instead, grounded in post-structuralism and deconstruction, it works to actively critique heteronormativity, exposing and breaking down traditional assumptions that sexual and gender identities are presumed to be heterosexual or cisgender.

In The History of Sexuality, Foucault argues that repressive structures in society police the discourse concerning sex and sexuality and are thus relegated in the private sphere. As a result, heterosexuality is normalized while homosexuality (or queerness) is stigmatized. Foucault then points out that this imposed secrecy has led to sexuality as a phenomenon that needs to be frequently confessed and examined. Foucault's work is particularly important to queer theory in that he describes sexuality as a phenomenon that "must not be thought of as a kind of natural given which power tries to hold in check" but rather "a historical construct." Judith Butler extends this idea of sexuality as a social construct to gender identity in Gender Trouble: Feminism and the Subversion of Identity, where they theorize that gender is not a biological reality but rather something that is performed through repeated actions.

Queer theory is the lens used to explore and challenge how scholars, activists, artistic texts, and the media perpetrate gender- and sex-based binaries, and its goal is to undo hierarchies and fight against social inequalities. Due to controversy about the definition of queer, including whether the word should even be defined at all or should be left deliberately open-ended, there are many disagreements and often contradictions within queer theory. In fact, some queer theorists, like Berlant and Warner and Butler, have warned that defining it or conceptualizing it as an academic field might only lead to its inevitable misinterpretation or destruction, since its entire purpose is to critique academia rather than become a formal academic domain itself.

== Queer theory and communication studies ==
Queer theory is applied to different disciplines, including communication studies and research. It was introduced to the field of communication through Jeffrey Ringer's Queer Words, Queer Images: Communication and the Construction of Homosexuality in 1994, which offered a queer perspective to communication research findings. Queer theory has also contributed to communication research by challenging the heteronormative society's notions of what's considered deviant and taboo—what is considered normative and non-normative.

=== Queering family communication ===
Queer theory's interdisciplinarity is evident in its application in and critique of family communication. One of the criticisms regarding family communication is its focus on "mainstream" families, often focusing on heterosexual parents and children.

Although more studies on family communication have started to include nontraditional families, critical rhetorical scholar Roberta Chevrette argues that researchers continue to look at nontraditional families, including families with openly queer members, from a heteronormative lens. That is, when studying LGBTQ+ families, many scholars continue to compare these families to their cis-heterosexual counterparts' norms. As Chevrette writes, "Queering family communication requires challenging ideas frequently taken for granted and thinking about sexual identities as more than check marks."

Chevrette describes four ways that scholars can "queer" family communication: (1) revealing the biases and heteronormative assumptions in family communication; (2) challenging the treatment of sexuality and queerness as a personal and sensitive topic reserved for the private sphere rather than the public; (3) interpreting identity as a socially constructed phenomenon and sexuality as being fluid in order to expose the ways gender roles and stereotypes are reinforced by notions of identity and sexuality as being fixed; and (4) emphasizing intersectionality and the importance of studying different identity markers in connection with each other.

== Intersectionality and queer theory ==
The concept of queer theory has emerged from multiple avenues that challenge the definition of normality. However, institutions often tend to prioritize one marginalized group over others, resulting in limited social change. As activist Charlene A. Carruthers describes in her book Unapologetic, it is important to imagine "alternative economics, alternative family structures, or something else entirely" from an imagination of cross-sectional communities – such as her stance as a Black queer feminist. Imagination is a crucial aspect of queer theory. It is a tool for creating new worlds that are currently not viable for under-represented or oppressed communities, prompting a transformative stance to current norms. An intersectional approach decentralizes queer theory and thus shifts power to a more radical set of narratives, aligning with the definition of queerness itself: challenging prominent, white, and heterosexual discourses.

According to critical theorist Daniel J. Gil De Lamadrid, intersectionality can be used to examine how queer identity is racialized as normatively white, and the intersectional stigma and resistance that comes from such racialization.

Intersectionality recognizes that complex identities and social categories form from "structured multiple oppression." Therefore, the personal identities of intersectional people are inherently political. Groups such as the Human Rights Campaign have previously employed this understanding in formal rights advocacy for queer legal protection. However, queer theorists and activists like Lisa Duggan have noted that such groups prioritize the voices of some groups over others by focusing on specific identities like "gay middle-class men" rather than complex and intersectional ones. They have emphasized the importance of intersectionality in queer discourse and activism. New directions in queer intersectionality include Jones' "euphorias" studies showing intersectional differences in diverse LGBTIQA+ peoples' experiences of happiness. Specifically, Jones found that happiness was often used as a reward for performance of intersectional normativity; those who were lesbian and yet also cisgender and mothers were more likely to experience euphoric moments even in discriminatory settings. However, LGBTIQA+ people who had "other othered" identities such as disabilities were less likely to report experiencing euphoria. Jones argues being euphorically queer should not presume typical happiness narrative arcs and should make room for negativity; queer diverse people will need to critique society and critique critique of society but can still be euphoric about being queer and intersectional.

== Queering heterosexuality ==
Major efforts of early queer theory included making heteronormativity visible, critiquing and undermining the normativity of heterosexuality, and challenging and destabilizing the homosexual/heterosexual binary.

"Queering heterosexuality" under queer theory refers to efforts to subvert heteronormativity; according to Nick Rumens, Eloisio Moulin de Souza, and Jo Brewis, one of the principle aims of queering heterosexuality is to "denaturalize heterosexuality, to dispossess it of its claims to be normal and, in so doing, rupture the foundations of heteronormativity." Judith Butler described a "heterosexual matrix" that dictates the rules under which bodies, genders, and desires are considered "natural" and "normal." Queering heterosexuality can mean disrupting those rules through practicing heterosexuality in anti-homophobic non-normative ways, illuminating that there are many different heterosexualities rather than a single monolithic normative one, applying a queer lens to historical figures and classic literature and identifying "inherently queer heterosexual practices," and challenging the labels of "homosexual" and "heterosexual" entirely.

Scholars have pointed out that "heterosexual" is in many ways a constructed category that can be destabilized by queerness. As Sandra Jeppesen wrote in a 2012 essay, "queering heterosexuality reveals that the categories homosexual and heterosexual are wholly inadequate to describe the vast array of sexualities available to us once we start exploring beyond the heteronormative." Similarly, Heather Brook noted in 2018 that the term "queer heterosexuality" creates fears of appropriation, but it also forces an exploration of how heteronormative institutions like marriage can be defined outside of binary oppositions like "hetero and homo; men and women; queer and straight."

Some lesbian feminist scholars have objected to the idea that heterosexuals could theoretically identify as queer and have criticized the field of queer theory for it. In a 1994 paper, Celia Kitzinger and Sue Wilkinson wrote that "the notion of the 'queer heterosexual' has become established in queer theory … not, apparently, because many people are convinced of either its possibility or its desirability, still less because it names significant contemporary identities, but because queer heterosexuality is a necessary component of 'gender-fucking.'" In 2004, Annette Schlichter noted that "critics concerned about issues of lesbian visibility and difference occasionally raise the specter of the queer heterosexual ... as an indication of the queer project's perversion of social and political identities and their relations to power."

== Queer ecology ==
Queer ecology describes the application of queer theory to human interpretations of ecological relationships, including sexuality, social gender roles, and the disruption of culturally-informed binaries such as nature (natural vs. unnatural), life (living vs. nonliving) and intelligence (intelligent vs. unintelligent).

== Criticisms ==
A recurring criticism of queer theory, which often employs sociological jargon, is that it is written, according to Brent Pickett, by a "small ideologically oriented elite" and possesses an evident social class bias. It is not only class biased but also, in practice, only really referred to at universities and colleges. Likewise, Ros Coward writing in The Guardian, says that advocates of queer theory are like other elite academics that engage in obscurantism with their use of jargon to protect their field from outside criticism and fail to deconstruct their own role and perspective as academics at elite institutions.

According to Joshua Gamson, due to its engagement in social deconstruction, it is nearly impossible for queer theory to talk about a "lesbian" or "gay" subject, as all social categories are denaturalized and reduced to discourse. Thus, according to Adam Isaiah Green, a professor at the University of Toronto, queer theory can only examine discourses and not subjectivities. Green further argues that queer theory might be doing a disservice to the study of queer people for, among other reasons, unduly doing away with categories of sexuality and gender that had an explanatory role in their original context. He argues that for instance the lesbians documented in the book Cherry Grove, Fire Island chose to identify specifically as either "ladies", "dykes" or "postfeminists" for generational, ethnic and class reasons. While they have a shared sexuality, flattening their diversity of identity, culture and expression to "the lesbian community" might be undue and hide the social contingencies that queer theory purports to foreground (race, class, ethnicity, gender).

Rosemary Hennessy argues that queer theory's focus on cultural and discursive representations of sexuality often ignores or minimizes the materialist feminist emphasis on capitalism and patriarchy. While queer theory critiques identity as a fixed category, it may fail to account for how systemic structures shape sexual identities and oppression beyond cultural representations.

For some feminists, queer theory undermines feminism by blurring the boundaries between gendered social classes, which it explains as personal choices rather than consequences of social structures.

Bruno Perreau, the Cynthia L. Reed Professor of French Studies at the Massachusetts Institute of Technology, discusses various facets of the French response to queer theory, from the mobilization of activists and the seminars of scholars to the emergence of queer media and translations. Perreau sheds new light on events around gay marriage in France, where opponents to the 2013 law saw queer theory as a threat to French family. Perreau questions the return of French Theory to France from the standpoint of queer theory, thereby exploring the way France conceptualizes America. By examining mutual influences across the Atlantic, he seeks to reflect on changes in the idea of national identity in France and the United States, offering insight on recent attempts to theorize the notion of "community" in the wake of Maurice Blanchot's work. Perreau offers in his book a theory of minority politics that considers an ongoing critique of norms as the foundation of citizenship, in which a feeling of belonging arises from regular reexamination of it.

In their work Cynical Theories, scholars Helen Pluckrose and James A. Lindsay claim queer theory has a largely unscientific view on biology and objective reality as an intentional feature. They state that, "queer theory is a political project and its aim is to disrupt". As such within it, "there can be absolutely no quarter given to any discourse—even matters of scientific fact—that could be interpreted as promoting biological essentialism." Thus, according to them, queer theory knowingly misrepresents biological facts and research, especially on intersex people, to conflate them with completely unrelated issues concerning constructed gender identities such as transgender.

== Queer theory in online discourse ==
One of the ways queer theory has made its way into online discourse is through the popularity of Adrienne Rich's 1980 essay "Compulsory Heterosexuality and Lesbian Existence". Rich's theory regarding compulsory heterosexuality (or comp-het)—the socio-cultural expectation that women must be attracted to men and desire a romantic heterosexual relationship—inspired the creation of the "lesbian masterdoc", a 30-page Google Document originally written in 2018 by Angeli Luz, a Tumblr user who was in the midst of questioning her own sexuality as a teenager.

Katelyn McKenna and John Bargh's studies of online groups consisting of marginalized groups found an interesting phenomenon called "identity demarginalization" — how participation in a group consisting of people with shared marginalized identity can lead to a higher level of self-acceptance, which could lead to eventually coming out to their friends and family.

Online groups and interactions also contribute to normalizing queerness and challenging heteronormativity by serving as a networked counterpublic. Sarah Jackson, Moya Bailey, and Brooke Foucault Welles' discourse analysis of the hashtag #GirlsLikeUs shows how trans women have used the hashtag to build community in ways that normalize being trans and offering counter-narratives to the often stereotypical and caricatured portrayal of trans people's lives in popular mainstream media.

== See also ==
- Queer archaeology
- Queer of color critique
- Queer theology
- Quare theory
- Neuroqueer theory
