= Amazones d'Hier, Lesbiennes d'Aujourd'hui =

- June 1982 cover
- Frequency: Quarterly
- Publisher: Louise Turcotte; Danielle Charest; Genette Bergeron; Ariane Brunet
- Founded: 1982
- Country: Montreal, Quebec, Canada
- Language: French
- OCLC: 952387424

Amazones d'Hier, Lesbiennes d'Aujourd'hui (AHLA; Amazons of Yesterday, Lesbians of Today) is a quarterly French language magazine published starting 1982 by a lesbian collective in Montreal made of Louise Turcotte, Danielle Charest, Genette Bergeron and Ariane Brunet.

AHLA was written from a radical lesbian (Lesbiennes radicales) perspective, and aimed to offer analysis and reflection about political and philosophical issues affecting lesbians globally as well as in Quebec.

The magazine's content drew heavily from Francophone material feminism, and the ideas of French theorists Monique Wittig and Nicole-Claude Mathieu. The front page of every issue clearly stated that the magazine was intended "for lesbians only".

== 1982 documentary ==
Amazones d'Hier, Lesbiennes d'Aujourd'hui
- Production company: Réseau Vidé-Elle
- Release date: June 13, 1982; (Canada)
- Running time: 105 minutes
- Country: Canada
- Language: French

An eponymously titled documentary was developed from 1979 to 1981 and produced by video production collective Réseau Vidé-Elle, in English and French versions. The film premiered on June 13, 1982, in Montreal.

== See also ==
- List of lesbian periodicals
- List of LGBT films directed by women
- List of LGBT-related films
