= Beatriz Santiago Muñoz =

Puerto Rican multimedia artist

- Born: 1972 (age 53–54); San Juan, Puerto Rico
- Education: University of Chicago, School of the Art Institute of Chicago

Beatriz Santiago Muñoz (born 1972) is an artist based in San Juan, Puerto Rico. Her work combines aspects of ethnography and theater to create film and video projects that have touched on subjects including anarchist communities, the relationship between artwork and work, and post-military land. Her work has been exhibited at the Tate Modern, the Whitney Biennial 2017, Galería Kurimanzutto, and the Guggenheim Museum. She is co-founder of Beta-Local, an art organization and experimental education program in San Juan, Puerto Rico.

== Career ==
Beatriz Santiago Muñoz received an undergraduate degree from the University of Chicago in 1993 and an MFA in Film and Video from the School of the Art Institute of Chicago in 1997. She has been featured in numerous solo and group exhibitions during the past 15 years.

Santiago Muñoz's first solo exhibition, The Black Cave, was presented in London in 2013. The exhibition featured two video projects, La Cueva Negra and Farmacopea, that explore how the Puerto Rican landscape has been influenced by the development of new infrastructure and tourism projects. La Cueva Negra focuses on the Paso del Indio, an indigenous burial site in Vega Baja, Puerto Rico. The site was accidentally uncovered during the construction of a highway twenty years ago. This video presents a dynamic history of the site through interviews with laborers, archeologists, and members of the surrounding community. Farmacopea sheds light on how the tourism industry has transformed and de-historicized the landscape of Puerto Rico. The film focuses on certain native toxic plant species, and the government's efforts to eradicate them. By focusing on the government's desire to render the landscape harmless, the film draws attention to how tourism is encourages the depiction of Puerto Rico as an idyllic and de-politicized Caribbean paradise.

Ojos Para Mis Enemigos, a video piece created bv Santiago Muñoz in 2014, explored the abandoned Roosevelt Roads Naval Station in Ceiba, Puerto Rico. The piece explored the displacement of families during the construction of the military base. During filming, Santiago Muñoz collaborated with Pedro Ortiz, a Ceiba resident whose family was displaced. The video follows several Ceiba residents, including Ortiz, and examines the lasting effects of military construction on the ability of residents to access land.

== Select works ==
- La Cueva Negra (2013), digital video
- Farmacopea (2013), 16mm film

== Exhibitions ==
=== Solo exhibitions ===
- The Black Cave (2013), Gasworks Gallery, in collaboration with the Tate Modern, London. The Black Cave (La Cueva Negra, 2013) draws on interviews with archaeologists and local residents, and explores the Paso del Indio, an indigenous burial ground in Puerto Rico that was discovered during the construction of a highway and eventually paved over.
- Beatriz Santiago Muñoz: A Universe of Fragile Mirrors (2016), Pérez Art Museum Miami, Miami, FL. This exhibition included a new work, Marché Salomon (2015), an alternative story about a popular Haitian market, a toxic tropical flower, or a newly discovered archeological site in Puerto Rico. The actors are ordinary people encouraged by the artist to use strategies from performance art and reenactment. The exhibition was organized by Pérez Art Museum Miami Assistant Curator, María Elena Ortiz. The accompanying exhibition catalogue Beatriz Santiago Muñoz: A Universe of Fragile Mirrors was published by PAMM on 2016.
- A Universe of Fragile Mirrors (2017), El Museo del Barrio, New York, NY. This is the third exhibition of El Museo's five-year series highlighting Latina artists. The exhibition consisted of continuous play film of non-linear narratives that push the established differences between documentary and fiction story-telling.
- Song, Strategy, Sign (2016), New Museum, NY, NY. A series of 16mm portraits of anthropologists, activists, and artists working in Haiti and Puerto Rico capturing the aspirations and imagined futures of those who are deeply invested in alternative models of being, and using them as allegories for larger political possibilities in the region. The film work was displayed as a three-channel video inspired by Monique Wittig’s 1969 novel, Les Guérillères. The video was a work in progress that Muñoz developed during a residency at the museum.

=== Group exhibitions ===
- Whitney Biennial (2017), New York, NY. This is the 78th survey of American contemporary art in the museum's ongoing series of annuals and biennials.
- Condo New York (2017), New York, NY. Condo New York is a collaborative exhibition by 36 galleries across 16 New York spaces. Santiago Muñoz video work was featured in the group exhibition (with artists Yann Gerstberger and Ramiro Chaves) at the CHAPTER NY gallery with Galeria Agustina Ferreyra from San Juan, P.R.

== Awards ==
- Herb Alpert Award in the Arts (2019)
- Louis Comfort Tiffany Foundation Award (2017)
- Creative Capital Visual Arts Award (2015)
- 2026 Guggenheim Fellowship in Film-Video.
