= Danielle Charest =

Canadian writer

Danielle Charest (1951 – October 13, 2011) was a Canadian writer and a figure in the Canadian radical lesbianism movement.

Charest was born in Sherbrooke, Quebec, in 1951. She graduated from the School for Advanced Studies in the Social Sciences in Paris, having written her thesis on gender relations in crime fiction. She subsequently obtained a higher degree in history, focusing on the treatment of lesbians and gay men in crime novels. Charest subsequently worked various odd jobs: folk singer, apple picker, house painter, cook in a fast-food restaurant, taxi driver, horseback riding teacher for children, and French teacher for adults. These experiences helped inspire some of her later works.

She co-directed a documentary film about violence against young girls, published several novels, and wrote in 1993 Ma maison, mon taxi, a biography of Fernande Chartrand, a taxi driver. In 1982, she co-founded as part of a lesbian collective in Montreal the quarterly radical lesbian magazine Amazones d'Hier, Lesbiennes d'Aujourd'hui.

She led debates on various subjects, published articles online, and contributed to Lesbia Magazine. Her book Haro sur les fumeurs, jusqu'où ira la prohibition? ("Haro on Smokers: How Far Will Prohibition Go?"), published in 2008, studies the progression of anti-smoking laws in France in the international context. According to Charest, efforts to punish smokers are part of a larger framework of moralism that could have far broader implications. Charest died in October 2011 at the Paris House for Women, a feminist collective, at age 60, after suffering an aneurism.

== Selected works ==
=== Crime novels ===
- L'Érablière, 1998
- L'Échafaudage, 1999
- L'Étouffoir, 2000
- L'Entrave, 2002
- Conte à rebours, 2003 (second edition in 2012)

=== Other works ===
- Ma maison, mon taxi, 1993
- Mais où est mais, 2000
- Tabac : Vérités et mensonges, 2006
- Lettreinfo, 2008
- Haro sur les fumeurs, jusqu'où ira la prohibition ?, 2008
- L'Enchilada, 2011

== See also ==
- Amazones d'Hier, Lesbiennes d'Aujourd'hui
