= Olivier Fillieule =

Olivier Fillieule is a political scientist and sociologist. Fillieule serves as Senior Researcher at CNRS (Centre national de la recherche scientifique) (CRPS Paris I Sorbonne), full-time Professor at the University of Lausanne, and Director of the Institute for Political and International Studies (IEPI).

In 1994, Fillieule and Nonna Mayer created the GERMM study and research group of the French Political Science Association. The research group is currently directed by Eric Agrikoliansky, Fillieule and Mayer. It focuses on the transformation of militant repertoires and sociography in contemporary Europe, conducting annual workshops, invitations of foreign and French researchers, symposia, conferences, student tutoring, research activities and publications.

In September 2002, Fillieule created the Research Center on Political Action of the University of Lausanne (CRAPUL). The group's aim is to assist PhD students and young researchers through frequent workshops, symposia and conferences. It also has a focus on research. The Center has a strong international orientation. It addresses themes such as political socialization, protest activity, political participation, participation in political parties, trade unions and social movements, lobbying and interest groups. CRAPUL has grown ever since its creation in September 2002, especially regarding conferences, the launching of collective research projects and a new series in social sciences at a Swiss publisher.

Fillieule's main fields of research and publication refer to social movements theories, the sociology of militantism and political activism, interactionist approaches, commitment and disengagement, gender approaches to social movements and activism, collective behavior, demonstrations, maintenance of order, police and repression and protests and mobilizations against AIDS, therapeutical activism, commitment in vaccine trials.

== Selected publications ==
- (With Eric Agrikoliansky and Isabelle Sommier) (eds.), Penser les mouvements sociaux, Conflits sociaux et contestation dans les sociétés contemporaines, Paris, La Découverte.
- (With Lilian Mathieu and Cécile Péchu) (eds.), Dictionnaire des mouvements sociaux, Paris, Presses de Sciences Po, 2009.
- (With Patricia Roux) (eds.), Le sexe du militantisme, Paris, Presses de Sciences Po, 2009.
- Fillieule, Olivier, Danielle Tartakowsky, La manifestation de rue, Paris, Presses de Sciences po, coll. Contester, 2008.
- (with Isabelle Sommier and Eric Agrikoliansky) (eds.), La généalogie des mouvements antiglobalisation en Europe. Une perspective comparée, Paris, Karthala, 2007.
- (With Pierre Favre and Fabien Jobard), L’atelier du politiste. Théories, actions représentations, Paris, La Découverte, 2007.
- (With Donatella Della Porta), Police et manifestants. Maintien de l’ordre et gestion des conflits, Paris, Presses de sciences po, 2006.
- (With Eric Agrikoliansky and Nonna Mayer), L'altermondialisme en France. Genèse et dynamique d'un mouvement social, Paris, Flammarion, 2005.
- (Ed), Le désengagement militant, Paris, Belin, 2005.
- (With Mounia Bennani-Chraïbi.) (eds.). Résistances et protestations dans les sociétés musulmanes, Paris, Presses de Sciences Po, 2003. (translation into Spanish, Bellaterra, 2005).
- (With Christophe Broqua), Trajectoires d’engagement. AIDES et Act Up, Paris, Textuel, coll portraits d’associations, October 2001.
- Stratégies de la rue. Les manifestations en France, Paris, Presses de Sciences Po, 435 p. February 1997.
- (Ed), Sociologie de la protestation. Les formes contemporaines de l'action collective en France, Paris, L'Harmattan, collection Dossiers, 300 p., nov 1993.
- (With Cécile Péchu), Lutter ensemble. Les théories de l'action collective, Paris, L'Harmattan, collection Logiques politiques, 221 p., March 1993.
- (With Lilian Mathieu and Patricia Roux), “Militantisme et hiérarchies de genre”, special issue, Politix, forthcoming in June 2007.
- (With Fred Eboko, Frédéric Bourdier, Christophe Broqua) (ed.), “Mobilisations collectives face au sida dans le monde : translations internationales et dynamiques locales”. Face à face : regards sur la santé, n° 7, 2005
- (With Eric Agrikoliansky and Nonna Mayer), “Militants de l’altermondialisme”, special issue, Politix, n°5, December 2005.
- (With Nonna Mayer), “Devenirs Militants”, Revue Française de Science Politique, vol. 51, n° 1, 2001.
