= Sylvie Tissot =

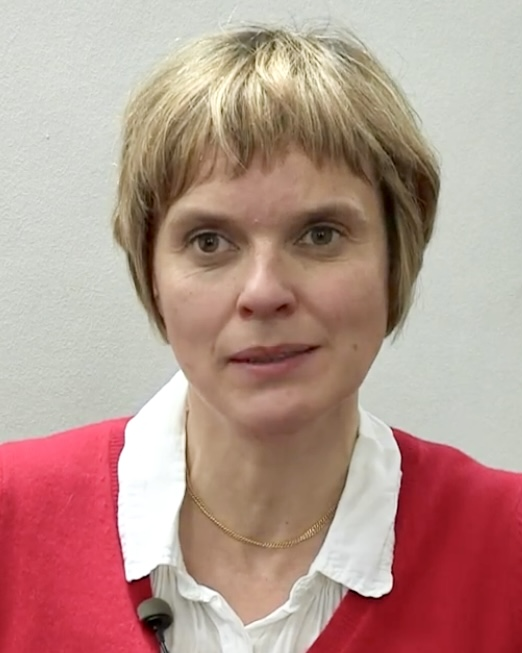
- Tissot in a December 2016 interview
- Born: 1971 (age 54–55)
- Education: Ecole des Hautes Etudes en Sciences Sociales; Sciences-Po; University of Minnesota
- Occupations: Activist; documentary filmmaker; sociologist

Sylvie Tissot (French: [silvi tiso]) is a French sociologist, activist and documentary filmmaker. She is a professor of Political Science at University of Paris-8 and a founder of the collective Les Mots Sont Importants.

== Biography ==
Born in 1971, Tissot studied at Sciences-Po, the University of Minnesota, and the Ecole des Hautes Etudes en Sciences Sociales, where she earned a PhD with highest honors. She began her career as an assistant professor at University of Strasbourg and now serves as a professor in the Political Science department at the University of Vincennes-Saint Denis Paris-8, directing the "Discrimination, Diversity and Representations" track in Master's Program in Political Science. She has been a Fulbright Scholar as well as a visiting scholar at NYU and Harvard University.

== Research ==
Tissot's research deals with urban policy and the transformation of major cities in France and the United States, focusing on such topics as public housing and gentrification. Her first book L'Etat et les quartiers. Genèse d'une catégorie de l'action publique (Seuil 2007) examines the evolution of public housing in France since World War II and the emergence of the "quartier sensible" ("sensitive neighborhood") as a category of state intervention. Tissot argues that a view of social ills as localized in at-risk neighborhoods replaced systemic economic analysis in French public policy.

Tissot's second book, De bons voisins. Enquête dans un quartier de la bourgeoisie progressiste (Raisons d'agir 2011) examines gentrification in Boston's South End. Through historical and ethnographic research, Tissot maps the contested, contingent processes that transformed the neighborhood. She focuses particularly on the ambivalent tool of "diversity", detailing the central role this principle played as a group of progressive upper-middle-class residents established themselves as a local elite in the formerly working-class neighborhood. Verso Books published an English translation of De bons voisins in 2015, entitled Good Neighbors: Gentrifying Diversity in Boston's South End.

Tissot's current research focuses on gay-friendliness in urban space.

Tissot is a member of the Cultures et Societés Urbaines (CSU) and Centre de Recherches Sociologiques et Politiques de Paris (CRESSPA) units at the Centre National de la Recherche Scientifique (CNRS) and serves on the editorial board of leading social science journal Actes de la recherche en sciences sociales, founded in 1975 by Pierre Bourdieu.

== Activism ==
In 2001, Tissot founded the activist collective Les Mots Sonts Importants with Pierre Tevanian and the lmsi.net website. Within the framework of this collective, she is particularly committed against policies restricting the right of entry and residence of foreigners, against double punishment and against impunity for police violence (notably during the forum "Let's Resist Together against Police Violence" organized with the Mouvement Immigration Banlieue in 2002).

Within the Collective Une École Pour Tou-te-s, she protests against the law on religious signs at school.

In 2008, she participated in the creation of the French feminist collective Les TumulTueuses and in its actions, notably against the anti-nawab laws (anti-niqab law of 2010) and anti-prostitution laws (law penalizing the client in 2013).

She stands for equal rights to marriage and parenthood between homosexuals and heterosexuals.

== Film ==
In 2015, Tissot released two documentaries she directed with her sister, curator and filmmaker Florence Tissot: Je ne suis pas féministe, mais... and L'Abécédaire de Christine Delphy. Je ne suis pas féministe, mais... premiered in March 2015 and traces the biography, career and intellectual contributions of Christine Delphy, one of the founders of the French Women's Liberation Movement and of materialist feminism. L'Abécédaire features an extended dialogue between Sylvie Tissot and Delphy, examining major issues in Delphy's thought.

== Bibliography ==
- Tissot, Sylvie (2007). L'Etat et les quartiers. Genèse d'une catégorie de l'action publique. Paris: Seuil.
- Tissot, Sylvie (2011). De bons voisins. Enquête dans un quartier de la bourgeoisie progressiste. Paris: Raisons d'agir. ISBN 9782912107633.
- Tissot, Sylvie (2015). Good Neighbors: Gentrifying Diversity in Boston's South End. Translated by David Broder; Catherine Romatowski. Verso. ISBN 9781781687925.

== Filmography ==
- Je ne suis pas féministe, mais... dir. Florence Tissot and Sylvie Tissot, 2015.
- L'Abécédaire de Christine Delphy dir. Florence Tissot and Sylvie Tissot, 2015.
