= Radical lesbianism =

Radical lesbian movement in reaction to mainstream feminism

Radical lesbianism is a lesbian movement that challenges the status quo of heterosexuality and mainstream feminism. It arose in part because mainstream feminism did not actively include or fight for lesbian rights. The movement was started by lesbian feminist groups in the United States in the 1950s and 1960s. A Canadian movement followed in the 1970s, which added momentum. As it continued to gain popularity, radical lesbianism spread throughout Canada, the United States, and France. The French-based movement, Front des Lesbiennes Radicales, or FLR, organized in 1981 under the name Front des Lesbiennes Radicales. Other movements, such as Radicalesbians, have also stemmed off from the larger radical lesbianism movement. In addition to being associated with social movements, radical lesbianism also offers its own ideology, similar to how feminism functions in both capacities.

== History ==
Radical or "separatist" lesbianism and other similar movements represent a rupture with the broader feminist movements. They offer an attempt by some feminists and lesbians to try to reconcile what they see as inherent conflicts with the stated goals of feminism. Many of these conflicts and ruptures are a result of issues arising from broader and nationally specifically cultural narratives around women. Some of them are created independently in response to these needs, while others draw inspiration from radical movements in other countries. This results in no single history of radical lesbianism, but of separate national struggles.

Internationally, radical lesbians often took advantage of convergent international spaces to create their own events to increase the visibility of lesbianism. Examples of this include the 1994 lesbian march in New York on the 25th anniversary of Stonewall. Another example was at the 1995 Beijing hosted World women's Conference. A third example took place during the 1997 Amsterdam hosted Gay Games.

=== Asia ===
In Asia, radical lesbianism lagged a decade behind Europe, Latin America and North America, with the movement not starting until the 1980s. It was in this period that activists starting forming their own groups and creating their own publications.

=== Europe ===
European radical lesbianism developed during the 1970s in response to specific situations in different European countries. International Lesbian Front was created in 1974 in Frankfurt, Germany. ILIS (International Lesbian Information System) was created in Amsterdam, the Netherlands in 1977.

==== France ====
Following the 1970s Canadian movement, a radical lesbian movement in France began to take shape in 1981. Front des Lesbiennes Radicales was proposed as an organization in June 1981. In a way similar to the American and Canadian movements, these radical, French lesbians sought to carve out space for themselves within feminism and within politics as a whole. They focused on the representation of lesbians and excluded heterosexual women, although they differentiated themselves from lesbian separatists.

The Front des Lesbiennes Radicales were inspired by the words and writings of French philosopher Monique Wittig, and their philosophic inquiries began through a Paris-based group including Wittig and Simone de Beauvoir who published the journal Questions féministes. Wittig's 1981 essay, One is not Born a Woman, titled after Simone de Beauvoir's observation, posits that "Lesbians are not women," as "what makes a woman is a specific social relation to a man, a relation that we have previously called servitude, a relation which implies personal and physical obligation as well as economic obligation, ... a relation which lesbians escape by refusing to become or to stay heterosexual". Wittig also believed that "lesbianism provides ...the only social form in which (lesbians) can live freely".

In the encyclopedia Who's Who in Lesbian and Gay Writing, editor Gabriele Griffin calls Wittig's writing "part of a larger debate about how heteropatriarchy and women's oppression within it might be resisted."

=== Latin America ===
Latin American radical lesbianism developed during the 1970s, and like other parts of the movement, resulted from specific national conditions. Radical lesbianism began to develop in Mexico in 1977, led by the group Mujeres guerreras que abren caminos y esparcen flores (Oikabeth). Radical lesbianism arose in Chile in 1984 in response to national conditions resulting from the dictatorship. Costa Rica developed a radical lesbianism movement in 1986.

During the 1980s and 1990s, life for lesbians in Latin America was difficult because of lesbophobic repression across the region. Consequently, the communities in Chile, Mexico, Costa Rica, Puerto Rico, Argentina and Brazil began working more closely together on shared goals.

=== North America ===
==== Canada ====
After gaining momentum in the U.S., radical lesbianism made its way to Canada in the 1970s. Quebec and Toronto were the predominant cities in which the Canadian movement took place. Lesbian organizations in Canada focused on building up lesbian culture and making service available to the Canadian lesbian community. The Lesbian Organization of Toronto, for example, established Amethyst, which provided services for lesbians who were struggling with addiction.

==== United States ====
Second-wave feminism was influential in the development of radical lesbianism, and the number of radical lesbian organizations in the U.S. grew from the 1960s through the early 1980s. Moreover, the creation of radical lesbianism was directly linked to other left-wing social movements such as the New Left, the Vietnam-era Antiwar movement, and the American civil rights movement.

== Ideology ==
=== Radical and liberal movements ===
Though both radical and liberal currents within feminism seek social change, there is a distinctive difference between the two. Radical movements such as radical lesbianism seek to dismantle the status quo whereas liberal movements seek to reform it. Additionally, radical movements align with liberation whereas liberal movements focus more heavily on equality. Radical lesbianism specifically sought to challenge male domination and male-centered definitions of gender and sexuality.

=== Feminism ===
Radical lesbianism is separate from other feminist movements because it exists in opposition to the exclusion of lesbian women from mainstream feminism. For example, Radicalesbians formed in response to Betty Friedan's declaration that lesbians should not be involved in the feminist movement because they were a "lavender menace" on the movement's work. The group repurposed the phrase "lavender menace," painting it on t-shirts in preparation for a protest at the Second Congress to Unite Women in May 1970. There, they distributed "The Woman-Identified Woman," which remains a key early lesbian-feminist work.

=== Internal problems ===
A radical lesbian community in Toronto excluded those who were bisexual, or identified as trans women.

== Difference from lesbian separatism ==
The principles of radical lesbianism are similar to those of lesbian separatism; however, there are some important differences. In her preface to Monique Wittig's The Straight Mind and Other Essays, Quebec radical lesbian Louise Turcotte explains her views that "Radical lesbians have reached a basic consensus that views heterosexuality as a political regime which must be overthrown." Turcotte notes that lesbian separatists "create a new category" (i.e., complete separation not only from men but also from heterosexual women)" and that the radical lesbian movement aims for the "destruction of the existing framework of heterosexuality as a political regime". Turcotte goes on to discuss Adrienne Rich's landmark essay, Compulsory Heterosexuality and Lesbian Existence, noting that Rich describes heterosexuality as a violent political institution that has to be "imposed, managed, organized, propagandized and maintained by force". Rich sees lesbian existence as an act of resistance to this institution, but also as an individual choice, whereas the principles of radical lesbianism see lesbianism as necessary, and consider its existence as necessarily outside of the heterosexual political sphere of influence.

== Creating a culture ==
The end goal of many radical lesbian groups was to create a new lesbian culture outside of the confines of heterosexuality. One way of doing this was through the written word. The 1980s and 1990s saw the development of a number of Francophone lesbian periodicals in Quebec, Canada, including Amazones D'Hier: Lesbiennes d'Aujourd'hui, Treize, and L'Evidante Lesbienne. This was also a period of strength for French-language lesbian presses, such as Editions nbj and Oblique Editrices, and lesbian bookstores like Montreal's L'Essentielle.

Radical movements seek to challenge the status quo, producing material goods such as art, music, and other consumable goods — a consumerism that leads to tangible representations of identity. Lesbian activists also began cultivating their own material economy.

== See also ==
=== Organizations ===
- Daughters of Bilitis (1955)
- The Furies (1971)
- Olivia Records
- Radical Faeries (1979)

=== People ===
- Rita Mae Brown
- Michèle Causse
- Karla Jay
- Barbara Love
- Del Martin and Phyllis Lyon
- Martha Shelley
- Ellen Shumsky

=== Publications ===
- Lesbian Connection
- Lesbian Tide
- "The Woman-Identified Woman"

=== General ===
- Get the L Out
- Lesbian erasure
- Lesbian utopia
- Separatist feminism
- Womyn's land
- LGBT history
