= Am I a Lesbian? =

2018 resource document by Angeli Luz

- Author: Angeli Luz
- Language: English
- Subject: Lesbian identity, compulsory heterosexuality
- Published: January 2018
- Media type: Google Doc, PDF
- Pages: 30

"Am I a Lesbian?" is a document written by Tumblr user Angeli Luz (Note: Some sources incorrectly spell Luz's first name "Anjeli".) and first shared via Google Docs through her blog in 2018. Written over two days, the zine-like guide presents a series of questions that Luz was considering for herself at the time of writing while she attempted to understand her sexual orientation. Many of the document's questions engage with the concept of compulsory heterosexuality, a social force theorized by Adrienne Rich in 1980.

Since its release, the document has been widely reshared as a PDF and via other social media, especially TikTok since the 2020s. An article in Them described the "Am I a Lesbian?" as "part of the online queer canon"; it is frequently referred to as the "lesbian masterdoc" (Note: Spelled by some sources as "lesbian master doc".) in online queer spaces. Criticism of the document has focused on its articulation of "compulsory heterosexuality", which differs from Rich's initial conception of the term.

== Publication and content ==
"Am I a Lesbian?" was first published as a 30-page (Note: Some sources, such as a 2021 Autostraddle article, cite the document as 31 pages in length.) Google Docs document by Angeli Luz on her Tumblr blog cyberlesbian in January 2018. Luz, then a high school student, wrote the document over the course of two days in her late teens after coming to terms with her attraction to women and trying to determine whether her attraction to men "was real or a social construct [she] took in as a facet of [her] identity". Luz remained anonymous as the guide's author until 2020 when she was interviewed about the document for an article in Vice.

"Am I a Lesbian?" is divided into 20 sections and formatted "like a blog post, not a scientific paper; it's rife with bulleted lists, inconsistent capitalization, and conversational asides". Stefanie Duguay, a professor of communication, likened the document to a zine. The work offers a series of questions to help the reader determine whether they experience attraction to women and whether attraction they feel towards men is genuine or is guided by compulsory heterosexuality, a social force first theorized by American essayist and feminist Adrienne Rich in her 1980 article "Compulsory Heterosexuality and Lesbian Existence" (though Rich is not mentioned in "Am I a Lesbian?"). Compulsory heterosexuality, also referred to as "comphet" in the document, is argued by "Am I a Lesbian?" to be the pervasive assumption that women's attraction to men is socially constructed and enforced through societal pressures and norms. The document affirms lesbian identities and queer attractions for transgender and nonbinary readers, and regardless of past attraction to or romantic/sexual experience with men.

"Am I a Lesbian?" has been widely redistributed; while the original Google Docs link became unavailable by 2020 (ostensibly for violating the Google Docs terms of service), the text of the guide was reshared in PDF form on other platforms like Twitter and Reddit. Luz's original post had garnered over 30,000 notes on Tumblr by 2024, and the guide had become known colloquially as the "lesbian masterdoc" by that same year in some online queer communities.

== Legacy and responses ==
"Am I a Lesbian?" was described by Quispe López in Them in 2024 as "part of the online queer canon" and as having attained a cult following. Celebrities Reneé Rapp and Kehlani have cited the document as helping them come to terms with their lesbian identities. Variations on the document from other authors, such as a similar resource called "Am I Trans?", have since also been shared. References to "Am I a Lesbian?" and compulsory heterosexuality as articulated by the document became common on TikTok in the early 2020s; some TikTok videos misattributed the coinage of "compulsory heterosexuality" to "Am I a Lesbian?".

Duguay described the treatment of compulsory heterosexuality in "Am I a Lesbian?" as overemphasizing the experiences of individuals and minimizing the social and political aspects of Rich's original theorization of the concept. According to Duguay, the document's framing of compulsory heterosexuality as "an individual problem is not going to invoke change at these bigger societal levels". Caroline Godard, a scholar of French literature, wrote that "the Masterdoc hints that compulsory heterosexuality is a way of thinking about one's relationship to the world — it is an epistemological orientation that one can, with practice, choose to opt out of — whereas for Rich, compulsory heterosexuality describes how the world is organized", concluding that the document suggests a person may opt out of compulsory heterosexuality through an arrival at a personal lesbian identity, which is not possible in Rich's conception of the concept. A study published in the Journal of Lesbian Studies described the shifting understanding of compulsory heterosexuality from Rich's theorization to "Am I a Lesbian?" to TikTok as a limited form of generation loss within the queer communities studied.
