= Marguerite Thibert =

French feminist and international civil servant

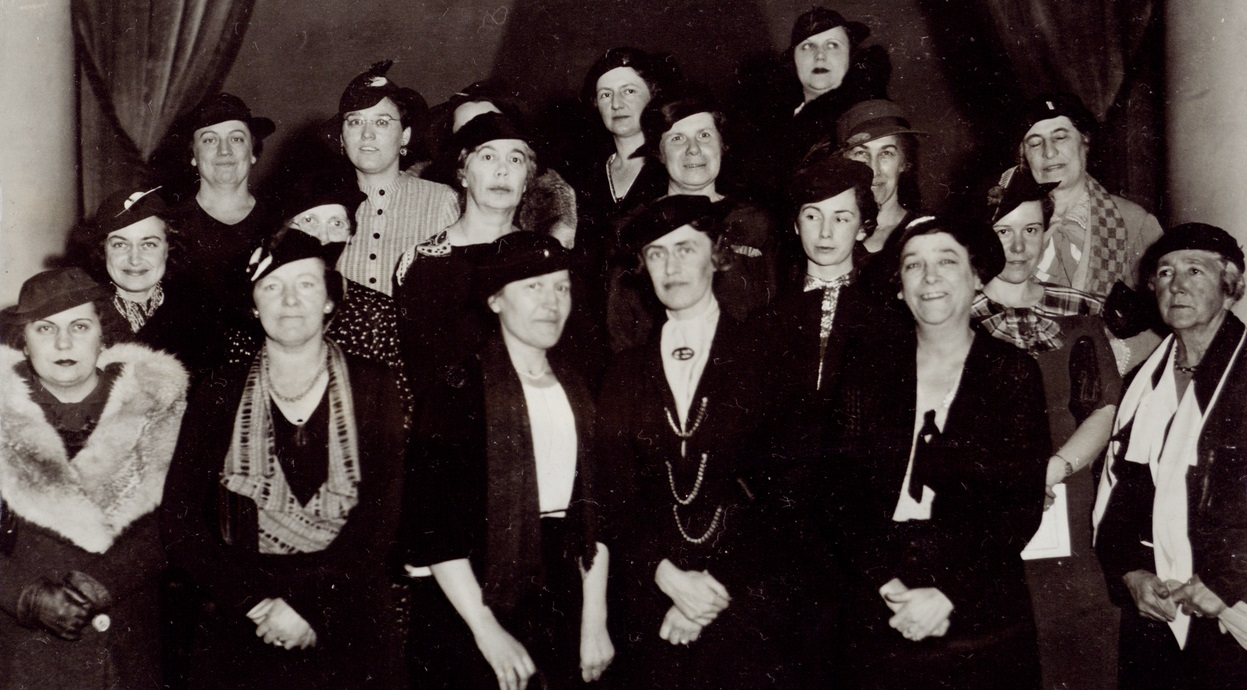
- Thibert in 1935 (first row, third from left)
- Born: Paule Lucie Marguerite Javouhey; 31 January 1886; Chalon-sur-Saône, France
- Died: 14 November 1982 (aged 96); Paris, France
- Education: Sorbonne University
- Occupation: International civil servant
- Years active: 1926–1982
- Organization: International Labour Organization
- Known for: Women's rights

Paule Lucie Marguerite Javouhey, better known as Marguerite Thibert, (1886–1982) was a French academic, advocate for women's rights and an international civil servant. Thibert worked for the International Labour Organization (ILO), from 1926 onwards, engaged with numerous women's organizations, including the French Association for University Women (Association Française des Femmes Diplômées des Universités) and the Correspondence Committee on Women's Work and published many works on women's issues.

== Personal life ==
Marguerite Thibert was born on 31 January 1886. She was born at home, in Chalon-sur-Saône, France, into a religious family which, in 1806, established the congregation of the Sisters of St. Joseph of Cluny Abbey located in Saône-et-Loire, France. However, she later distanced herself from the church. She was the second of four siblings, born after Elise and before Marie and Pierre. Thibert did not like sharing many details about her private and personal life; many of the things historians know today are thanks to letters Thibert exchanged with friends, family and acquaintances.

In 1912, she married George Thibert, and in the following year, the newlyweds welcomed their one and only daughter. The couple was only married for three years until George's death of tuberculosis in 1915. Thibert lived another 67 years before she died in 1982 at the age of 96.

Throughout her career, Thibert travelled around the world, including extensive travels in Africa, Asia, Europe, Latin America, Canada and the United States. During World War II in particular, she spent time working for the International Labour Organization in Montreal, forcing her to leave her mother, daughter and grandchildren in France. However, her departure was delayed due to the birth of her grandson.

Thibert spoke five languages (French, German, Italian, English and Spanish) which allowed her to actively engage with international key figures at the time, including the American Secretary of Labour Frances Perkins, Eleanor Roosevelt, Mexico's first female ambassador Palma Guillén and Sun Yat-sen's widow. Despite the vast amount of travel Thibert embarked on, she maintained close connections with her sister Marie and the rest of her family throughout her life.

=== Education ===
Thibert was part of the first generation of women to attend university in France. She was a student at Sorbonne University where she earned her PhD with her thesis titled "Le féminisme dans le socialisme français de 1830 à 1850" (Feminism within French Socialism from 1830 to 1850). Thibert was the 12th woman to receive a PhD in humanities in France.

== Professional life ==
=== International Labour Organization ===
Some of Thibert's most important professional achievements happened while working in the International Labour Organization. She joined the organisation in 1926 in Geneva, after finishing her PhD and being recommended by her supervisor Célestin Bouglé. Here, she was responsible for gathering information and writing reports on the conditions of women's and children's labour throughout the world. More specifically she worked on issues such as unequal pay and lack of maternity benefits. These issues also influenced Thibert's own professional life as she had to confront discrimination and tough working conditions within the ILO. Women within the ILO faced issues of obtaining permanent contracts, opportunities for promotion and equal pay for equal work.

Thibert continued to work well beyond the official retirement age of the ILO. She officially retired from the ILO in 1951 after a period of working under part-time contracts.

==== Mexico ====
Throughout her work with the ILO, Thibert took a special interest in Mexico. After attending the second American Conference on Labour (Las Conferencias Americanas del Trabajo), she spent time in Mexico observing and studying the labour conditions women and children faced in the country. In her own words, going to Mexico at the time was important because it was a country "where women's work is growing, and where, two years ago, a special organism within the Ministry of Labour was created, and seems to be very active to deal with the problems related to the work of women and minors."

After her first trip, Thibert returned to Mexico in 1941 to continue her work. She was in Mexico during a time of plausible prosperity. From her observations, she published two works: "El aprendizaje en Mexico y su reglamentación eventual" (Learning in Mexico and its Eventual Regulation), where she reported on the conditions minors faced, such as low salary. She also published "Pequeños comerciantes y pequeños trabajadores callejeros" (Young Merchants and Young Street Workers).

=== Feminism ===
Thibert lived through an era of significant change for women. New work opportunities started to emerge for women in international institutions after 1919. This overlapped with Thibert's search for a career promotion. She managed to get employment at the ILO despite the lack of women's rights and opportunities of employment for women in France at the time.

In addition to her career at the ILO, Thibert was a member of several national and international organisations that focused on women's rights such as equal wages and opportunities in the workplace. She also dedicated herself to these goals when she worked for the ILO where she uncovered the limited number of employment opportunities for women within the ILO. Moreover, she also fought for the prohibition of nighttime work for women in the organization.

Her activism continued after her retirement from the ILO throughout the 1960s, 70s and 80s.

In 1965 she participated in the Women's Democratic Movement (Mouvement Démocratique Féminine) together with Colette Audry, Madeleine Guilbert, Gisèle Halimi, Andrée Michel, and Évelyne Sullerot. They advocated for the unification of socialism and feminism. Thibert continued her political activism and fought for equal working rights for women and saw this as a crucial policy for any socialist party.

==== Correspondence Committee on Women's Work ====
Throughout her life as a feminist activist, Thibert had close ties to many feminist and women's organizations. In particular, she had close relations with Émilie Gourd and Anna Boschek who were members of the Correspondence Committee on Women's Work.

During the late 1930s, Thibert contributed to the organization by ensuring that vast collections of documents did not disappear in the face of the rise of fascism in Europe at the time. This included her own articles and reports, letters that she had received, copies of letters she had sent and archival treasures. These documents highlighted significant issues that otherwise could have been lost in the face of fascist ideology.

Moreover, Thibert ensured and directed the development of an extensive network between the ILO and the committee during the 1930s. In addition, she developed relations between the committee and the governments of Canada and the United States during the years of World War II, when she was stationed in Montreal. She worked hard, together with members of the committee, to ensure that the political and social gains for women on the home front would not disappear after the end of the war.

In light of societal changes in Europe during the late 1930s, Thibert's views also evolved from pacifism to anti-fascism. She was a popular woman at the time amongst the Jewish and Social Democratic women on the committee as she devoted herself to providing aid and assistance to victims of fascism in Europe. These included Emmy Freundlich, Käthe Leichter and Fanni Blatny. Thibert successfully managed to help Emmy Freundlich and Fanni Blatny to safety, but despite her efforts, Käthe Leichter was executed in the Ravensbrück concentration camp in 1942.

=== Other engagements ===
Thibert became a member of the Women's International League for Peace and Freedom (WILPF) right after the end of World War II. She was also supported by other international women's organizations including the International Council of Women, the International Alliance of Women and the International Federation of University Women. These institutions were essential in helping Thibert to Montreal despite her director's threat to suspend her contract.

==== French Association of University Women ====
Thibert joined the French Association of University Women (Association Française des Femmes Diplômées des Universités) in 1923 and she remained loyal to the organization throughout the rest of her life. The association became a crucial part in helping Thibert achieve a professional research career that would fulfill her personal goals and ambitions. However, despite this, Thibert did not hold back on the critique of the organization as she worked for a more aggressive activist approach.

== Works ==
Despite her strong belief in women's rights and socialism, many of Thibert's works were often impersonal. As an ILO civil servant her work was kept anonymous with very limited reference to her personal sentiments. One example of her work is an article entitled "The Economic Depression and the Employment of Women: I" in which she examines issues of female unemployment from a global perspective.

Thibert also authored an article in the French pacifist review "Peace by Law" (La Paix par le Droit) entitled "Emigration and International Peace" (L'émigration et la paix internationale). The goal of this paper was to create awareness around the issue of social protection of immigrants in France.

== See also ==
- Feminism in France
- Socialist feminism
- Suffragette

== Bibliography ==
- Booris, Eileen, Dorothea Hoehtker and Susan Zimmermann. Women's ILO: Transnational Networks, Global Labour Standards and Gender Equity, 1919 to Present. Leiden, Boston: Koninklijke Brill and International Labour Organization, 2018. ISBN 978-92-2-130073-1
- Chaperon, Sylvie. "Une génération d'intellectuelles dans le sillage de Simone de Beauvoir." Intellectuelles, no. 13 (2001): 99–116.
- Cross, Máire Fedelma. "Une traversée du siècle: Marguerite Thibert, Femme engagée et fonctionnaire internationale." French History, Volume 32, Issue 2 (2018): 302–304.
- Herrera León, Fabián. "Las Condiciones De Trabajo De Las Mujeres y De Los Menores Mexicanos: Los Viajes De Estudio De Marguerite Thibert (1939–1942)." EN-CLAVES Del Pensamiento, no. 33 (2023): e551.
- Janz, Oliver, and Daniel Schönpflug. Gender Histories in a Transnational Perspective: Networks, Biographies, Gender Orders. New York, Oxford: Berghahn Books, 2014. ISBN 978-1-78238-274-4
- Mosconi, Nicole. "Françoise Thébaud, Une traversée du siècle. Marguerite Thibert, femme engagée et fonctionnaire internationale." Travail, Genre Et Sociétés, no. 41 (2017): 189–193.
- Thébaud, Françoise. Marguerite Thibert (1886–1982). In: Diplômées, no. 272-273 (2020) Les Pionnières. p. 285–298.
- Thébaud, Françoise. Une Traversée du Siècle: Marguerite Thibert, Femme engageé et fonctionnaire internationale. Paris: Belin, 2017. Kindle. ISBN 978-2-410-00549-3
- Thibert, Marguerite. "The Economic Depression and the Employment of Women: I," International Labour Review 27, no. 4 (1933): 443–470.
