= Patricia Roux =

Swiss sociologist

Patricia Roux is a Swiss sociologist and feminist who taught at the Université de Lausanne for over 20 years. Now retired, she became specifically interested in women's studies in 1996. In September 2000, the university appointed her to the first post of Professor of Gender Studies in Switzerland. Since 2001, together with Christine Delphy, she has headed the editorial board of the academic journal of feminism Nouvelles Questions Féministes. Roux continues to publish widely, taking an active interest in the status of women in Switzerland and beyond. .

== Biography ==
Trained as a sociologist, Patricia Roux initially spent almost 20 years on research into intergroup relationships at the University of Lausanne before taking a special interest in women in 1996, drawing on the work carried out in Quebec, Canada, and in other countries for quite a number of years. This led to a focus on how male domination affects the material conditions of women's existence such as their frequent assignment to domestic work or discrimination against them in the labour market. In September 2000, she was assigned to the first post of gender studies in Switzerland which was created at the University of Lausanne. More recently she has examined how far the unequal treatment of women results from sexist, racist and capitalist systems of oppression.

In 2000, she was behind the creation of LIEGE, le Laboratoire Interfacultaire en Etudes Genre, which provided a basis for collaboration on gender studies with other universities, bringing together some 1,500 students and faculty staff from across Switzerland. In 2008, the collaborative facility was renamed Centre en Etudes Genre. In 2012, specifically for the needs of the University of Lausanne, a gender studies platform (Plateforme en études Genre) was created to further research in collaboration with other university departments.
