= Actes de la recherche en sciences sociales =

French social science journal

The Actes de la recherche en sciences sociales is a quarterly French academic journal of social science established in 1975 by Pierre Bourdieu at the Maison des sciences de l'homme (MSH). It is published by Éditions du Seuil and produced in collaboration with the Centre de sociologie européenne (a Centre national de la recherche scientifique laboratory based at the University of Paris-1 and the École des hautes études en sciences sociales), as well as the Collège de France, the Fondation Maison des sciences de l'homme, and the Centre national du livre.

Bourdieu was the editor-in-chief until his death in 2002. François Denord later served in the post; the current editor-in-chief is Sylvie Tissot.

From 1991 to 1995, there was a supplemental publication called Liber: a European book review, which had previously been published (1989–1991) as a supplement to several European publications including Le Monde and The Times Literary Supplement. Bourdieu established Liber with Gian Giacomo Migone, editor of the Italian literary review L'Indice dei libri del mese.

Since February 2007, the archives from 1975 forward have been made available via Persée.

== Abstracting and indexing ==
The journal is abstracted and indexed in Current Contents/Social & Behavioral Sciences and the Social Sciences Citation Index. According to the Journal Citation Reports, the journal has a 2015 impact factor of 0.164.
