= Questions féministes =

Questions Féministes
- Discipline: Feminism
- Language: French

Publication details
- History: 1977–1980

Standard abbreviations
- ISO 4: Quest. Fém.

Indexing
- ISSN: 0154-9960
- JSTOR: quesfemi

Questions féministes (Feminist Questions) was a French feminist journal published from 1977 to 1980.

== History ==
The journal was founded by a group of feminists that included Simone de Beauvoir, Christine Delphy, Colette Capitan, Colette Guillaumin (although she does not appear on the editorial board that inaugurates the journal), Emmanuèle de Lesseps, Nicole-Claude Mathieu, Monique Plaza, and later Monique Wittig. It published for three years, ultimately dissolving over divided perspectives on heterosexuality, which came to a head in the May 1980 issue with opposing essays from Wittig on the one hand ("The Straight Mind") and Emmanuèle de Lesseps ("Heterosexuality and Feminism") on the other. The editorial collective agreed to stop publishing Questions feministes, and one group of editors, including Delphy and Beauvoir, left to launch a new journal instead, called Nouvelles Questions Féministes (New Feminist Questions).
