= Mounia Bennani-Chraïbi =

Moroccan political researcher

- منية بناني الشرايبي
- Scientific career
- Fields: Political science

Mounia Bennani-Chraïbi is a Moroccan political scientist, author and professor at the University of Lausanne. She published several works on activism, social media, youth issues and elections.

== Biography ==
Bennani-Chraïbi attended Paris Institute of Political Studies, where she earned her PhD in political science in 1993.

Between 2002 and 2004, Bennani-Chraïbi was the director of Diploma of Higher Specialized Studies (DESS in France) on "Arab world, contemporary Muslim world".

She completed her habilitation at Université Paris Sciences et Lettres (PSL) in 2019.

== Books ==
Bennani-Chraïbi is the author of the books:

- Soumis et rebelles: les jeunes au Maroc (1994).
- Partis politiques et protestations au Maroc (1934-2020) (2021)

She is also a co-editor of multiple edited volumes including:

- Résistances et protestations dans les sociétés musulmanes (edited with Olivier Fillieule, 2003)
- Scènes et coulisses de l'élection au Maroc: les législatives 2002 (edited with Myriam Catusse and Jean-Claude Santucci, 2005)
- Jeunesses des sociétés arabes: par-delà les promesses et les menaces (edited with Iman Farag, 2007)
