= Nouvelles Questions Féministes =

- Discipline: Feminism
- Language: French

Publication details
- History: 1981–present
- Frequency: Biannually

Standard abbreviations
- ISO 4: Nouv. Quest. Fém.

Indexing
- ISSN: 0248-4951
- JSTOR: nouvquesfemi

Links
- Journal homepage

Nouvelles Questions Féministes (NQF; New Feminist Questions) is a biannual French peer-reviewed academic journal of feminism published by Editions Antipodes. Since 2001, the journal's French and Swiss editorial board has been headed by Christine Delphy and Patricia Roux. The journal is currently based at the University of Lausanne and LIEGE (Laboratoire interuniversitaire en Etudes Genre, or Inter-university Lab for Gender Studies).

== History ==
The journal was established in 1981 by a group of feminists including Simone de Beauvoir, Christine Delphy, Claude Hennequin and Emmanuèle de Lesseps. It was a successor of Questions féministes following a schism in that journal's editorial collective over the status of women's participation in heterosexuality.

== Abstracting and indexing ==
The journal is abstracted and indexed in Scopus.
