= The Opoponax =

1964 book by Monique Wittig

- Cover of the first edition in French
- Author: Monique Wittig
- Original title: L'Opoponax
- Language: French
- Genre: Novel
- Publisher: Les Éditions de Minuit
- Publication date: 1964
- Publication place: France
- Media type: Print
- Followed by: The Lesbian Body

The Opoponax (French: L'Opoponax) is a 1964 novel by French writer Monique Wittig. It was translated into English in 1966 by Helen Weaver, and published in the US by Simon & Schuster. The title comes from opoponax, also known as bisabol.

== Plot introduction ==
L'Opoponax is about "children undergoing typical childhood experiences like the first day of school and the first romance".

== Structure ==
The book contains no common paragraphs, with each (regularly sized) chapter consisting of a single, extended paragraph. Chapters have no numbering or headings. It is written with the author addressing the protagonist as "you" and describing to her the events of the book.

== Literary significance and criticism ==
The novel won the Prix Médicis in 1964. Nathalie Sarraute said, at the awards, "I shall probably not be there to witness it, but in ten or twenty years you will see what a writer we have honored here."

The New Yorker called it 'a charming feat of virtuosity'. The New York Times Book Review said Wittig has 'made what can only be called a brilliant re-entry into childhood.'.

Mary McCarthy, in The Writing on the Wall and Other Literary Essays (1970), devoted a chapter to the book, describing it as "...the book I've argued for -- and about -- most of this year."

Marguerite Duras wrote of it: "It is a remarkable and very important book because it is governed by a single iron rule: that is, to use nothing but pure description conveyed by purely objective language. A masterpiece."

Daughters, Inc., a lesbian feminist independent publisher, reprinted the novel in 1976.
