= The Lesbian Body =

1973 book by Monique Wittig

- Cover of the first edition
- Author: Monique Wittig
- Original title: Le Corps Lesbien
- Language: French
- Genre: Feminist, philosophical novel
- Publisher: Les Éditions de Minuit
- Publication date: 1973
- Publication place: France
- English publication date: 1975
- Media type: Print (Paperback)
- Pages: 188 (first edition)
- OCLC: 463238535
- Preceded by: The Opoponax
- Followed by: Brouillon pour un dictionnaire des amantes

The Lesbian Body (French: Le Corps Lesbien) is a 1973 novel by Monique Wittig. It was translated into English in 1975.

According to Wittig's The New York Times obituary, "lesbian lovers literally invade each other's bodies as an act of love."

Wittig said "When I came upon the title, Corps Lesbien, the association of these two words made me laugh. It was absurdly sarcastic."
