= Michèle Causse =

French academic (1936–2010)

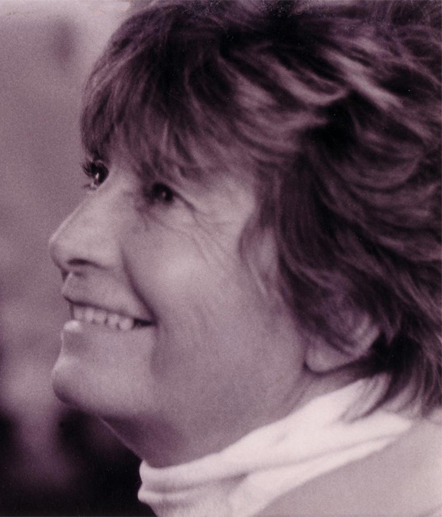
- Causse in 2010
- Born: 29 July 1936; Martel, Lot, France
- Died: 29 July 2010 (aged 74); Zurich, Switzerland
- Occupation: Author
- Known for: Radical activism

Michèle Causse (29 July 1936 – 29 July 2010) was a French activist, author, and self-proclaimed radical lesbian.

== Early life ==
Causse was born in the Martel region of Lot in France. She later taught in Tunisia, and then lived for ten years in Rome, where she studied Chinese. After that, she moved to Martinique and then to the United States before emigrating to Canada.

== Theory ==
Canadian academic Clive Thompson has referred to Causse as a "writer of radical lesbian texts." In her works, she is critical of heterosexuality, stating that "as long as a woman wishes to please a man, she is inauthentic... She does not have the integrity, the un-corruptibility that comes with not wishing to please."

Causse was also critical of both the Women's Movement and the concept of a homosexual movement, stating, "I am not a feminist, I am not a homosexual, I am a radical lesbian." She believed that "the women's movement is sustained by lesbians in every country; it is a lesbian movement, profoundly lesbian." She was also critical of the influence of patriarchy on lesbians, claiming that lesbians were "phallicized" in the 1980s by the male homosexual movement.

== Translations ==
Causse translated between the French, English, and Italian languages and was fluent in all three languages. Her translations of works included texts by Herman Melville, Gertrude Stein, Ti-Grace Atkinson, Djuna Barnes, Jane Bowles, Willa Cather, Mary Daly, Ignazio Silone, and Alice Munro.

== Last years and death ==
In her last years, she lived in the southwest of France. Causse chose to end her life on her 74th birthday, with assistance from Dignitas, a Swiss non-profit organization for physician-assisted suicide.

Although Causse had no terminal illness, she listed several medical issues as reasoning for her medically-assisted death, including vertebral compression fractures exacerbated by osteoporosis, the loss of a kidney, and asthma.

She died on 29 July 2010. Her death was filmed and shown in the documentary Dignitas - la mort sur ordonnance, which aired on Swiss television.

== Bibliography ==
- Dé/figures du soi, (unpublished)
- Hors de soi in ...Disent-ils, Ed. Ahla/Bagdam, Montreal / Toulouse, 2006
- Concept d'amour né de l'écriture de ( ), Bagdam Espace Lesbien, Toulouse, 2006
- Contre le sexage, le bréviaire des Gorgones, Ed. Balland, Paris, 2000
- Court of appeal, récit en anglais, Revue Tessera, Montreal, 1996, in Anthologie Orlanda Frauenverlag, Berlin, 1997
- Quelle lesbienne êtes-vous ?, Paroles de lesbiennes, Archives Recherches Cultures Lesbiennes ARCL, Paris, 1996, 72 p.
- Duelle, Revue Treize, Montreal, 1994
- Voyages de la grande naine en Androssie, Ed. Trois, Laval, Quebec, 1993
- L’Interloquée-Les Oubliées de l’oubli-Dé/générée, Ed. Trois, Laval, Quebec, 1991
- The world as will and representation in Lesbian Philosophies and cultures, Ed. Jeffner Allen, 1990, pages 259–274
- L'ilote, Revue Trois, Montreal, 1990
- A quelle heure est la levée dans le désert ?, Ed. Trois, Laval, Quebec, 1990
- ( ), (prononcer Parenthèses), Collection Topaze, Ed. Trois, Laval, 1987, 148 p.
- Le monde comme volonté et représentation in Emergence d'une culture au féminin, Ed. St Martin, Montreal, 1986
- Lettres à Omphale, Ed. Denoël-Gonthier, Paris, 1984
- Rencontre avec Djuna Barnes in L'almanach des dames, Ed. Flammarion, Paris, 1982, Amsterdam, 1983, pages 139–160
- Berthe ou un demi-siècle auprès de l'Amazone, Ed. Tierce, Paris, 1982
- L'intruse, poésie, Ed. du Nouveau Commerce, Paris, 1980
- Petite réflexion sur Bartleby, Ed. du Nouveau Commerce, Paris, 1980
- Lesbiana. Seven Portraits, Ed. du Nouveau Commerce, Paris, 1980
- Dire du corps, corps du dire in Journal d'une femme soumise de Mara, Ed. Flammarion, Paris, 1979, Amsterdam, 1981
- Ecrits Voix d'Italie, Ed. des Femmes, Paris, 1977
- L’encontre, Ed. des Femmes, Paris, 1975

== Multimedia ==
- La narrée navrée, lecture, Centenaire de Violette Leduc, video, Arras, 2007
- Une écrivain en terres occupées, film de Michel Garcia-Luna, DVD 47mn20, Ed. Lunaprod, 2005
- Corps de paroles, film of Suzanne Vertue and Dianne Heffernan, 37mn, Video-elles, Montreal, 1989
- A la lettre, cassette, Ed. Anne-Marie Alonzo, Montréal

== Articles ==
- Nomen est omen, post-face in "Défigures du soi", (inédit)
- Claude Cahun ou la mutante héroïque, Pour une anthologie des créatrices lesbiennes dans la Résistance, a cura di Paola Guazzo, Bagdam Espace Lesbien, avril 2008
- La narrée navrée, Centenaire de Violette Leduc, Revue Trésors à prendre, dir. Elisabeth Seys, 2007
- Inside Deep throat, commentary on the film Deep Throat, in collaboration with Katy Barasc, Sysiphe, 2006
- Pourquoi les gays ne peuvent-ils pas être les alliés objectifs des lesbiennes ?, Les Pénélopes, 2002, Bagdam Espace Lesbien, 2006
- Noir dessein (lettre à Nicolas Hulot), Bagdam Espace Lesbien, 2006
- Le genre comme espace de contention, Université de Beyrouth, 2005
- A propos de Lynndie England : Tragédie de la mimesis ou comment muer l'objet en sujet répréhensible, in collaboration with Katy Barasc, Sysiphe, 2004
- Qui a peur de Valerie Solanas ?, Bagdam Espace Edition, Toulouse, 2004, pages 19–35
- Hommage à Monique Wittig, Tribute to Monique Wittig. Extrait du chapitre "La grande Pérégrine" in Voyages de la Grande Naine en Androssie (Ed. Trois, Montréal, 1993), numéro spécial, Labrys-études féministes, Brasília-Montreal-Paris, September 2003
- Sur le voile, Sisyphe, 2003
- Une politique textuelle inédite : l'alphalecte in Lesbianisme et féminisme. Histoires politiques, Ed. L'harmattan, 2002
- L'universite : Alma mater ou père indigne ?, 2e Colloque international d'études lesbiennes: La grande dissidence et le grand effroi, Actes du colloque Espace lesbien n° 2, Bagdam Espace Edition, Toulouse, 2001
