= Les Guérillères =

1969 novel by Monique Wittig

- Author: Monique Wittig
- Translator: David Le Vay
- Language: French
- Genre: Novel
- Publisher: Les Éditions de Minuit
- Publication date: 1969
- Publication place: France
- English publication date: 1971

Les Guérillères is a 1969 novel by Monique Wittig. It was translated into English in 1971.

Les Guérillères is about a war of the sexes, where women "engage in bloody, victorious battles using knives, machine guns and rocket launchers". Moreover, sympathetic males join them in their combat.

== Literary significance and criticism ==
An early appreciation of the English translation (by David Le Vay) came from British journalist Sally Beauman, writing in The New York Times Book Review. Beauman considered it a miraculous achievement: it "is the first novel (or hymn, for this book is close to epic poetry) of Women's Liberation". However, Roger Sale in The New York Review of Books opined, "The book itself turns out to be, sadly, oddly, at times almost maddeningly, quite dull".

Some say the novel is based on a concept of women's superiority. "... [F]ine feminist critics like Toril Moi and Nina Auerbach have read Les guérillères as a closed structure, in which women win the war and institute a new equilibrium of women ruling men". Toril Moi described the novel as a "depict[ion of] ... life in an Amazonian society involved in a war against men .... [in which] [t]he war is finally won by the women, and peace is celebrated by them and the young men who have been won over to their cause." According to Nina Auerbach, the novel "is the incantatory account of the training and triumph of a female army. Here, the buried warfare of ["Muriel"] Spark's communities explodes in a new Amazonianism." These interpretations are not universal, as Linda M.G. Zerilli argued that more important was Monique Wittig's creation of an "'open structure' of freedom."

Polyandry, described in the novel, is interpreted by Laurence M. Porter as part of "militant feminist autonomy".

The novel's 1985 English translation says, "[o]ne of ["[t]he women"] ... relates the story of Vlasta. She tells how under Vlasta's guidance the first female State was created.... Another of them recalls that in the female State men were tolerated only for servile tasks and that they were forbidden under pain of death to bear arms or mount on horseback.... Vlasta's warriors teach all the peasant women who join them how to handle arms." "The women address the young men in these terms, now you understand that we have been fighting as much for you as for ourselves." "They say, it would be a grave mistake to imagine that I would go, me, a woman, to speak violently against men when they have ceased to be my enemies." "[T]hey sing and dance.... Someone interrupts them to praise those males who have joined them in their struggle. Then, ... she begins to read an unfolded paper, for example, When the world changes and one day women are capable of seizing power and devoting themselves to the exercise of arms and letters in which they will doubtless soon excel, woe betide us. I am certain they will pay us out a hundredfold, that they will make us stay all day by the distaff the shuttle and the spinning-wheel, that they will send us to wash dishes in the kitchen. We shall richly deserve it. At these words all the women shout and laugh and clap each other on the shoulder to show their contentment."

By an interpretation, the women and "those men of good will who come to join them" reconcile. Also by an interpretation, "[a]s in the legend of the Amazons, ... it is the women who decide both where to live and how to govern."

== Impact on popular culture ==
The novel inspired Beatriz Santiago Muñoz's Song, Strategy, Sign (2016) film work.
