= Andrée Michel =

French sociologist and activist (1920–2022)

- Born: Adèle Marie Albe Constance Vieille; 22 September 1920; Vallauris, France
- Died: 8 February 2022 (aged 101); Bussy-Saint-Georges, France
- Education: Aix-Marseille University; Grenoble Alpes University; Panthéon-Sorbonne University
- Occupations: Sociologist; activist

Andrée Michel (22 September 1920 – 8 February 2022) was a French sociologist, feminist, anticolonialist, and antimilitarist.

== Sociology ==
After earning a law degree from Aix-Marseille University, Michel studied philosophy at Grenoble Alpes University and became a secondary school teacher. Following the Liberation of France, she moved to Paris and earned a doctorate in sociology from Panthéon-Sorbonne University in 1959. She began to focus on discussions of discrimination, gender and class inequalities, militarization, and citizenship. Her first publication covered the conditions for Algerian workers in France.

A resident of Montreuil from 1950, Michel shared her daily life with migrant workers, prostitutes, and working-class families. In 2007, she noted that "today, the poor have as much difficulty finding accommodation in the capital as fifty years ago". She joined the French National Centre for Scientific Research in 1951 and taught abroad at multiple universities in the United States, Algeria, Canada, Latin America, and Belgium.

== Feminism ==
An outspoken feminist activist, Michel joined Mouvement français pour le planning familial and Pénélopes. In 1965, she participated in the Mouvement démocratique féminin alongside Madeleine Guilbert, Marguerite Thibert, Gisèle Halimi, Colette Audry, and Évelyne Sullerot. In 1973, Michelle Perrot hosted the first course on women's history in France at the Jussieu Campus. Michel was in attendance at the conference "La femme et la famille dans les sociétés développées".

Michel was the author of La femme et la famille dans les sociétés développée, as well as Le Féminisme, which was published in Que sais-je? in 1980. She was heavily critical of the existing patriarchy in France.

== Anticolonialism and antimilitarism ==
During the Algerian War, Michel was a part of the Jeanson network and testified at trial in favor of those charged with crimes. She was known to have suggested to Charlotte Delbo that she publish the book that became known as Auschwitz and After. She was the first woman to work as a human researcher at the Groupement des scientifiques pour l'information sur l'énergie nucléaire and joined forces with Monique Sené in 1985 to publish texts on the relationship between militarization and violence against women. Outraged by French nuclear tests in Tahiti and New Caledonia, she showed solidarity with victims of the tests in those regions.

Michel began studying the military–industrial complex, a term which she was one of the first French authors to use. Her texts on this issue served as a precursor to her works on intersectionality. In 1984, she declared that "In 1980, when I began research on militarization, I called myself a pacifist [...]. Today, I prefer to declare myself an anti-militarist". In 1990, she created the network Citoyennes pour la paix, which sent thousands of signatures to the United Nations Security Council to vote against the Gulf War. In 1995, she published Justice et vérité pour la Bosnie-Herzégovine, expressing her anger against the Srebrenica massacre and those who contributed to the Bosnian Genocide. In Surarmement, pouvoir, démocratie, she explained how the patriarchy used the notions "security" and "national defense" to oppress women. In Citoyennes militairement incorrectes, she illustrated the large profits received by the military-industrial complex throughout the 20th Century. According to the book's preface by Jules Falquet, "What we spend on weapons is always that much less for music, poetry or the decongestion of the courts which set the amounts of alimony".

== Death ==
Michel died on 8 February 2022, at the age of 101.

== Books ==
- Les Travailleurs algériens en France (1956)
- Famille, industrialisation, logement (1959)
- La Condition de la Française d'aujourd'hui (1963)
- Family Issues of Employed Women in Europe and America (1971)
- Activité professionnelle de la femme et vie conjugale (1973)
- Les femmes dans la société marchande (1974)
- The Modernization of North African Families in the Paris Area (1974)
- Travail féminin, un point de vue (1975)
- Femmes, sexisme et sociétés (1977)
- Le Féminisme (1979)
- Femmes et multinationales (1981)
- Les Femmes en France dans une société d'inégalités (1982)
- Sociologie de la famille et du mariage (1986)
- Justice et vérité pour la Bosnie-Herzégovine (1995)
- Surarmement pouvoir, démocratie (1995)
- Citoyennes militairement incorrectes (1999)
- Féminisme et antimilitarisme (2012)
