= Nicole-Claude Mathieu =

French anthropologist

Nicole-Claude Mathieu (1937–2014) was a French anthropologist, feminist, academic and writer, who is remembered for her contributions to gender studies, including women's rights, the institution of marriage, materialist feminism and women's oppression. An active contributor to feminist journals, from 1971 she served as Chef de travaux at the Laboratoire d'anthropologie sociale where she edited the journal L'Homme while contributing many articles of her own. From 1990, she was maîtresse de conférences at the School for Advanced Studies in the Social Sciences. In June 1996, she received a doctorate honoris causa from the Université Laval.

== Biography ==
Born on 28 November 1937 in the Vendée department, Nicole-Claude Mathieu, the daughter of an engineer, was brought up by her paternal grandmother in eastern France during the years of the Second World War. She attended a girls school where she was taught by women teachers. From 1956 to 1962, she combined the study of French literature with sociology and ethnology, serving an internship with the French authorities in Bangui, Central African Republic.

From 1966 to 1969, she edited the UNICEF journal Les Carnets de l'enfance. After a year as a research assistant at the Centre d'études sociologiques, in 1971 she joined the Laboratoire d'anthropologie sociale where in 1977 she helped Christine Delphy and others to launch the journal Questions féministes. In addition she translated articles from English and coordinated the special diplomas from the School for Advanced Studies in the Social Sciences granted in some cases to those who had not passed the baccalaureate. From 1970 to 1998, she carried out research into sexual relations and feminism at a time when they were considered inappropriate fields of study. Mathieu was set on defending women's rights both inside and outside her institution. This no doubt explains why she was not promoted until 1990 when she was raised to the still modest grade of maîtresse de conférences until her retirement. It was thanks to the Canadian Université de Laval that in June 1996 she received an honorary Docteure en sciences sociales honoris causa.

Mathieu is remembered as a pioneer of materialist feminism, inspired by Marxist confrontation with French communism in the 1970s. The aim was to overcome patriarchy and capitalism in order to achieve gender equality. As a result, Mathieu's work was centred first and foremost on fighting ideologies which justified women's oppression.

Nicole-Claude Mathieu died of cancer on 9 March 2014 in Paris.
