= Rosemary Hennessy =

American academic and socialist feminist

- Born: March 2, 1950 (age 76)
- Education: Syracuse University
- Known for: Director of Center for the Study of Women, Gender, and Sexuality, Rice University

Rosemary Hennessy (born March 2, 1950) is an American academic and socialist feminist. She is a professor Emerita of English and Director of the Center for the Study of Women, Gender, and Sexuality at Rice University. She was part of the faculty at Rice since 2006.

She has written extensively on materialist feminism.

== Education ==
Hennessy received her Ph.D in English from Syracuse University, her M.A. in English from Temple University, and her B.A. in English from the University of Pennsylvania.

== Selected bibliography ==
=== Books ===
- Hennessy, Rosemary (1993). Materialist feminism and the politics of discourse. New York: Routledge. ISBN 9780415904797.
- Hennessy, Rosemary; Ingraham, Chrys (1997). Materialist feminism: a reader in class, difference, and women's lives. New York: Routledge. ISBN 9780415916349.
- Hennessy, Rosemary (2000). Profit and pleasure sexual identities in late capitalism. New York: Routledge. ISBN 9780415924269.
- Hennessy, Rosemary (2013). Fires on the border: the passionate politics of labor organizing on the Mexican frontera. S.l: University Of Minnesota Press. ISBN 9780816679621.
- Hennessy, Rosemary (2023). In the Company of Radical Women Writers. University of Minnesota Press. ISBN 9781517914905.

=== Book chapters ===
- Hennessy, Rosemary (2014), "Thinking sex materially: Marxist, Socialist, and related feminist approaches", in Evans, Mary; Hemmings, Clare; Henry, Marsha; Johnstone, Hazel; Madhok, Sumi; Plomien, Ania; Wearing, Sadie (eds.), The SAGE handbook of feminist theory, Thousand Oaks, California: SAGE, pp. 308–326, ISBN 9781446252413.

=== Journal articles ===
- Hennessy, Rosemary; Mohana, Rajeswari (1989). "The construction of woman in three popular texts of empire: Towards a critique of materialist feminism". Textual Practice. 3 (3): 323–359. doi:10.1080/09502368908582066.
- Hennessy, Rosemary (February 1993). "Women's lives/feminist knowledge: feminist standpoint as ideology critique". Hypatia. 8 (1): 14–34. doi:10.1111/j.1527-2001.1993.tb00626.x. S2CID 143470056.
- Hennessy, Rosemary (Summer 1993). "Queer theory: a review of the "Differences" special issue and Wittig's "The straight mind"". Signs. 18 (4): 964–973. doi:10.1086/494854. JSTOR 3174918. S2CID 143541345.
- Hennessy, Rosemary (1994). "Queer theory, left politics". Rethinking Marxism: A Journal of Economics, Culture & Society. 7 (3): 85–111. doi:10.1080/08935699408658114.
- Hennessy, Rosemary (Winter 1994–1995). "Queer visibility in commodity culture". Cultural Critique. 29 (29): 31–76. doi:10.2307/1354421. JSTOR 1354421.
- Hennessy, Rosemary (2006). "Returning to reproduction queerly: sex, labor, need". Rethinking Marxism: A Journal of Economics, Culture & Society. 18 (3): 387–395. doi:10.1080/08935690600748074. S2CID 143523306.

== See also ==
- Double burden
- Economic materialism
- Feminist economics
- Monique Wittig
