= Compulsory Heterosexuality and Lesbian Existence =

1980 essay by Adrienne Rich

- Author: Adrienne Rich
- Media type: Essay

Compulsory Heterosexuality and Lesbian Existence is a 1980 essay by Adrienne Rich, which was also published in her 1986 book Blood, Bread, and Poetry: Selected Prose 1979-1985.

== Summary ==
Compulsory Heterosexuality and Lesbian Existence is a text that is constructed to think about and inspire change about lesbian visibility, structures of lesbian sexuality, and the role of literary criticism in relationship to lesbianism. Adrienne Rich argues that heterosexuality is not "natural" or intrinsic in human instincts, but an institution imposed upon many cultures and societies that render women in a subordinate situation. It was written to challenge the erasure of lesbian existence from a large amount of scholarly feminist literature. It was not written to widen divisions but to encourage heterosexual feminists to examine heterosexuality as a political institution which disempowers women and to change it.

"Compulsory" means required or obligatory, and "heterosexuality" means the assumption that all romantic relationships are between a man and a woman. The normalcy of heterosexuality and the defiance of that are both political in nature. Adrienne Rich argues that heterosexuality is a violent political institution making way for the "male right of physical, economical, and emotional access" to women. She urges women to direct their attention and energies towards other women rather than men, and she portrays lesbianism as an extension of feminism. Rich challenges the notion of women's dependence on men as social and economic supports as well as for adult sexuality and psychological completion. She calls for what she describes as a greater understanding of lesbian experience, and she believes that once such an understanding is obtained, these boundaries will be widened and women will be able to experience the "erotic" in female terms.

In order to gain this physical, economical, and emotional access for women, Rich lays out a framework developed by Kathleen Gough (a social anthropologist and feminist) that lists "eight characteristics of male power in archaic and contemporary societies". Along with the framework given, Rich sets to define the term lesbianism by giving three separate definitions for the term. First, Rich sees lesbian existence as an act of resistance to this institution, but also as an individual choice, when in fact, the principles of radical lesbianism see lesbianism as necessary and consider its existence as necessarily outside of the heterosexual political sphere of influence. Next that, "Lesbian Identity is the sense of self of a woman bonded primarily to women who is sexually and emotionally independent of men." Lastly, far from suggesting that female sexual bonding is the only way that women experience women identification, the lesbian continuum is the overall "range—through each woman's life and throughout history—of woman-identified experiences, not simply the fact that a woman has had or consciously desired genital sexual experience with another woman". Below are the characteristics in which male power has demonstrated the suppression of female sexuality.

1. Forcing male sexuality upon women: rape, incest, torture, a constant message that men are better, and superior in society to women.
2. Exploiting their labor to control production: women have no control over choice of children, abortion, birth control and furthermore, no access to knowledge of such things.
3. Control over their children: lesbian mothers seen as unfit for motherhood, malpractice in society and the courts to further benefit the man.
4. Confinement: women unable to choose their own wardrobe (feminine dress seen as the only way), full economic dependence on the man, limited life in general.
5. Male transactions: women given away by fathers as gifts or hostesses by the husband for their own benefit, pimping women out.
6. Cramp women's creativeness: male seen as more assimilated in society (they can participate more, culturally more important).
7. Men withholding attainment of knowledge: "Great Silence" (never speaking about lesbian existence in history), discrimination against women professionals.

All of the characteristics show how the denial of sexuality for women is a means to control and suppress any transition, creativeness, and economic advancement of women. What is essential to lesbian identity is not women's genital activities with other women. It is their resistance to compulsory heterosexuality to a cultural system that compels women to invest their erotic energies in men. All of the above are forces that inhibit men to further ignore women as historically, culturally, and currently important. The characteristics show that society has forgotten that it is necessary (in order to function) to include women in both public and private spheres. Furthermore, the ignorance of a female's choice in sexuality has caused her position in society to be thought of as less, and more importantly, secondary to that of a man. A recurring point that Rich points out is the destruction of lesbian experiences in history (misplacement of documents, or destroying them in general) has led to a society in which having a lesbian experience, or being a lesbian all together is seen as 'the other' and unacceptable to most men and women.

Rich claims that women may not have a preference toward heterosexuality, but may find it imposed, managed, organized, propagandized, and maintained by society. In the workplace, for example, lesbian women are often still sexualized and forced to play the role of the 'heterosexual female'. Rich states, "Women endure sexual harassment to keep their jobs and learn to behave in a complaisant and ingratiatingly heterosexual manner... the woman who too decisively resists sexual overtures in the workplace is accused of being 'dried-up and sexless, or lesbian." She holds that women receive messages every day that promote heteronormativity in the form of myths and norms perpetuated by society. Rich argues that these myths have been accepted because of the historical lack of exposure that lesbians have received, being either stigmatized as diseased or ignored as non-existent. Indeed, Rich objects to the term lesbianism, which she sees as a stigmatized clinical term, instead advocating the terms lesbian existence for the historical and contemporary presence of lesbian creation and lesbian continuum to include the entire range of a woman-identified experience; she feels that new understanding and language must be created to counter the limited and clinical terms that society has historically used to describe those it views as deviant. Rich claims that once women see lesbian existence as more than mere sexuality, it is more likely that more forms of "primary intensity" between and among women will be embraced.

At certain points in history, homosexual men and lesbians have shared a social existence, and acknowledged a common fight against society; but Rich writes that to treat the lesbian experience as a version of male homosexuality is to discard it, denying the female experience and the realities it brings, falsifying lesbian history.

In other words, she argues that heterosexuality has been constructed by men historically and culturally to be the only way of existence to further the male need. Yet, if we forget about this ideology and experiment in order to see what one really needs, then it can truly be a woman's decision instead of a man's. Rich even goes to the extent to pose that women in the twelfth and fifteenth century, called the Beguines, shared living quarters, work and labor were even part of the lesbian continuum. Rich thinks of the word lesbian as meaning more than a sexual attraction and physical act, but an emotional and strong bond that women can share as they go through the same experiences. Furthermore, Rich explains that if heterosexuality is the natural way, as it was constructed over time, then women like in her examples would and were seen as deviants of society. Rich demonstrates that the debate over what is good, bad, right, or wrong is a detailed and subjective one. She asserts that if one understands the term lesbian, as broken down into either the lesbian continuum or lesbian existence, a woman can further her understanding of her own sexuality and the construction of female sexuality throughout history. Rich explains, "historians need to ask at every point how heterosexuality as institution has been organized and maintained through the female wage scale, the enforcement of middle-class women's 'leisure', the glamorization of so-called sexual liberation, the withholding of education from women, the imagery of 'high art' and popular culture, the mystification of the 'personal sphere, and much else'".

In 2004, Rich wrote "Reflections on Compulsory Heterosexuality" in order to address the criticism she received on her former essay "Compulsory Heterosexuality". Furthermore, Rich re-appropriates her argument and describes her initial intent for writing the essay. Rich states, "I undertook 'Compulsory Heterosexuality' ... to contribute to an issue on sexuality, from any perspective I chose. That it should be read as a manifesto or doctrine never occurred to me." Rich discloses that the purpose of "Compulsory Heterosexuality" was to complicate the proverbial, i.e., heterosexuality. In no way was Rich seeking a lesbian revolution against heterosexuality.

== See also ==
- Feminist sexology
- Lesbian separatism
