= Christine Delphy =

French sociologist and feminist activist (born 1941)

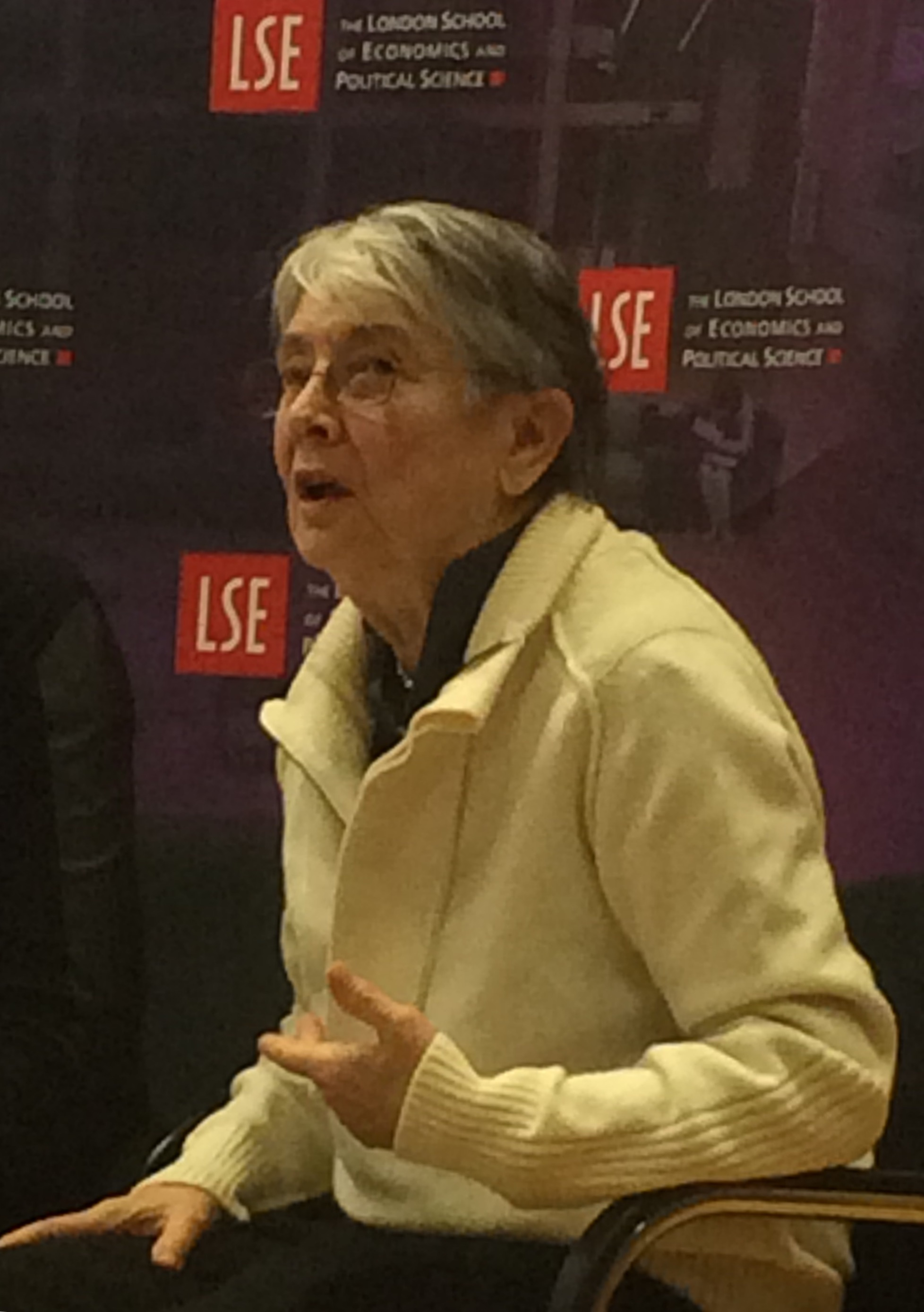
- Delphy at LSE, February 2016
- Born: 1941 (age 84–85); Paris, France
- Education: University of Chicago; University of Paris; University of California, Berkeley
- Occupations: Sociologist, activist
- Employer(s): University of California, Berkeley; University of Paris X: Nanterre; CNRS

Christine Delphy (French: [dɛlfi]; born 1941) is a French feminist sociologist, writer and theorist. Known for pioneering materialist feminism, she co-founded the French women's liberation movement (Mouvement de Libération des Femmes, or MLF) in 1970 and the journal Nouvelles questions féministes (New Feminist Issues) with Simone de Beauvoir in 1981.

== Biography ==
Christine Delphy was born in 1941 to parents who owned a local pharmacy. In the documentary film on her life and ideas, "Je ne suis pas féministe, mais..." ("I am not a feminist, but..."), Delphy describes an early feminist consciousness in observing her parents: though running the pharmacy was labor-intensive for both of them, when they came home at lunch, Delphy noticed her father putting his feet up to rest and read the newspaper while her mother was obliged to cook a midday meal and then do the dishes before they both returned to work.

Nevertheless, Delphy did not always identify as a feminist, owing to stigma around the term. In a television interview in 1985, she described a period of her life when she routinely prefaced comments with "Je ne suis pas féministe, mais..." (the phrase from which the film draws its title).

== Education ==
Delphy studied sociology at the University of Chicago, the University of Paris and the University of California, Berkeley. Returning to France, Delphy was interested in pursuing a dissertation project on women, but she describes in Je ne suis pas féministe, mais... meeting resistance to the topic in her then-advisor Pierre Bourdieu, who told Delphy that there was no one to advise such a project because no one researches women (though French sociologists like Andrée Michel had already published significant research).

Delphy agreed to pursue rural sociology instead, but the question of women, and particularly the economic role women played, emerged in this project as well. While pursuing fieldwork, "I realized there was a whole set of goods that absolutely did not pass through the marketplace," with much of women's economic contributions functioning as unpaid labor, in contrast to the wage labor that was central to theories of capitalist oppression (that is, the capitalist class extracts the value between the wages they pay workers and the actual value of what the workers produce).

"To a degree, the outline of [Delphy's magnum opus] The Main Enemy was already there. The bringing to light not just the economic exploitation of women, but a specific form of economic exploitation."

== Activism ==
Delphy arrived in the U.S. in 1962 during the Civil Rights Movement, and says that it was in the United States that she came to see the reality of racism. "Racism existed at home in France, but I didn't see it." In 1965, Delphy left Berkeley to work for the Washington Urban League and, through these experiences in the Civil Rights Movement, developed a belief in the value of oppressed groups (like women) developing autonomous activist movements, as African-Americans had done. She returned to France and after the events of May 1968, took part in a feminist group FMA (Féminin Masculin Avenir), which with other groups would eventually form the Women's Liberation Movement (Mouvement de Libération des Femmes, or MLF). In August 1970, Delphy and other members of the MLF brought flowers to the "unknown wife of the unknown soldier," the first of the MLF's actions to receive attention in the media. Delphy is openly lesbian and was a member of the Gouines rouges ("Red Dykes").

In 1971, she added her name to the Manifesto of the 343, publicly declaring she'd had an abortion when it was illegal in France.

In more recent years, the implementation of the 2004 French law on secularity and conspicuous religious symbols in schools—a law which includes banning French Muslim school-girls from wearing their headscarfs on school grounds—brought the issues and discrimination facing French Muslim women to Delphy's attention. In response to this, Delphy confronted and addressed the reaction of many French feminists who support the law, criticizing this stance as hypocritical and racist.

== Ideas ==
Materialist Feminism

Delphy was a pioneer of materialist feminism, applying a materialist approach to gender relations. Delphy analyzes inequalities between men and women as rooted in a material economic basis, specifically the domestic relations of production. This revision of Marxism questioned the idea that there are only capitalist classes. For Delphy, gender is also a position in the mode of production (domestic labor). In this view, the main enemy of women as a class is not capital but patriarchy. She also developed an analysis of gender arguing that gender precedes sex. Her theory constitutes a landmark in the process of denaturalizing sex, which is a marker of gender.

Along with Nicole-Claude Mathieu, Monique Wittig, and others, Delphy launched the materialist feminism school. Materialist feminism is particularly present in the journal Nouvelles questions feministes, still directed by Delphy.

Against Essentialism and the so-called "French Feminism"

Delphy challenges the biological essentialist view of gender, even when it comes from the women's movement. She also critiqued what she called "the invention of 'French Feminism'": she argues that most French feminists are against essentialism and very few support what was called "French Feminism" in the United States. For Delphy, the American invention of "French Feminism" had a political purpose: the acceptance of essentialism among Anglo-American feminists (it was expected they would think, If French women think this way, we have to respect and accept this).

All these ideas are elaborated in many articles from the 1970s, 1980s and 1990s in Questions féministes and Nouvelles questions féministes and were published in the following books: L'Ennemi principal, tome 1 : L'Économie politique du patriarcat (1997) and L'Ennemi principal, tome 2 : Penser le genre (2001).

== Bibliography ==
- The Main Enemy: A Materialist Analysis of Women's Oppression, Women's Research and Resources Centre Publications, London, 1977
- Close to Home: A Materialist Analysis of Women's Oppression, London, Hutchinson, & The University of Massachusetts Press, 1984
- Familiar Exploitation: A New Analysis of Marriage in Contemporary Western Societies, with Diana Leonard, Oxford, Polity Press, 1992
- L'Ennemi principal 1, Économie politique du patriarcat, Syllepse, "Nouvelles Questions féministes", 1998.
- L'Ennemi principal 2, Penser le genre, Syllepse, "Nouvelles Questions féministes", 2001.
- Le Cinquantenaire du Deuxième Sexe, with Sylvie Chaperon (dir.), Syllepse, 2002.
- Classer, dominer, Qui sont les "autres" ?, La Fabrique, 2008, ISBN 2-913372-82-1.
  - Translated into English as Separate and dominate: Feminism and Racism after the War on Terror, Verso, 2015.
- Un universalisme si particulier, Féminisme et exception française, Paris, Syllepse, 2010
- Un troussage de domestique (dir.), Paris, Syllepse, 2011
- Pour une théorie générale de l'exploitation: des différentes formes d'extorsion de travail aujourd'hui, Paris: Syllepse; Québec : M éditeur, 2015.

== Filmography ==
Christine Delphy appears in numerous films:

- Manifestation of the Women's Liberation Movement, Paris place de l'Étoile, RTF news, first appearance of a women's movement in Paris since the Second World War, near the Tomb of the Unknown Soldier, 1970
- Le Ghetto Expérimental by Jean-Michel Carré and Adams Schmedes, 1975
- Kate Millett talks about prostitution with feminists, Videa, during the prostitutes' strike in 1975 and after Kate Millett's book release (with French feminist such as Monique Wittig, Christine Delphy...), 1975
- Au nom des femmes, Simone de Beauvoir, émission Aujourd'hui la vie, debate on feminism Simone de Beauvoir, Delphine Seyrig, Christine Delphy..., A2 / France 2, 1985
- Thank God I'm a Lesbian! by Dominique Cardona and Laurie Colbert, 1992
- Simone de Beauvoir's Second Sex, on the 50th anniversary of the book's release, interviews by Michelle Perrot and Christine Delphy, TF1 TV news, 1999
- Debout ! A history of the Women's Liberation Movement 1970–1980, by Carole Roussopoulos, 1999
- Cinquantenaire du deuxième sexe, by Carole Roussopoulos and Christine Delphy, a film on the conference, 2001
- Bleu, blanc, rose by Yves Jeuland, 2002
- Un racisme à peine voilé by Jérôme Host, 2004
- La prostitution, TV show L'arène de France, with interviews of Christine Delphy, Nicole Borvo and Florence Montreynaud, A2 / France 2, 2007
- Chahinaz : quels droits pour les femmes, documentary on a young Algerian woman, with interview of Christine Delphy, France 5, 2007
- Encore elles ! by Constance Ryder and Josiane Szymanski, 40 years after MLF's birth, today who are the feminists?, 2011
- Carole Roussopoulos, une femme à la caméra, by Emmanuelle de Riedmatten, 2012
- Je ne suis pas féministe, mais... (I'm not a feminist, but...) by Florence Tissot and Sylvie Tissot, 2015
- L'Abécédaire de Christine Delphy (Christine Delphy from A to Z) by Florence Tissot and Sylvie Tissot, 2015

== See also ==
- Socialist feminism
