= Materialist feminism =

Type of feminism

Materialist feminism is a theoretical current of radical feminism that was formed around the French magazine Questions féministes. It is characterized by the use of conceptual tools from Marxism—notably historical materialism—to theorize patriarchy and its abolition.

Materialist feminism views both sex and gender as social constructs produced by reproductive exploitation and domestic subordination. Its body of literature includes an analysis of women's work within marriage and in the formal economy, criticism of other streams of feminism, deconstruction of sexuality and advocacy for an autonomous women's movement.

Jennifer Wicke defines materialist feminism as "a feminism that insists on examining the material conditions under which social arrangements, including those of gender hierarchy, develop... materialist feminism avoids seeing this gender hierarchy as the effect of a singular... patriarchy and instead gauges the web of social and psychic relations that make up a material, historical moment".

== History ==
The term materialist feminism emerged in the late 1970s and is associated with key thinkers such as Christine Delphy, Colette Guillaumin, Nicole-Claude Mathieu, and Monique Wittig.

Rosemary Hennessy traces the history of materialist feminism in the work of British and French feminists who preferred the term materialist feminism to Marxist feminism. In their view, Marxism had to be altered to be able to explain the sexual division of labor. Marxism was inadequate to the task because of its class bias and focus on production. Feminism was also problematic due to its essentialist concept of woman. Material feminism then emerged as a positive substitute to both Marxism and feminism and pointed out the unequal distribution of social resources.

The Grand Domestic Revolution by Dolores Hayden is a reference. Hayden describes material feminism at that time as reconceptualizing the relationship between the private household space and public space by presenting collective options to take the "burden" off women in regard to housework, cooking, and other traditional female domestic jobs. Margaret Benston presents a similar sentiment in her 1969 article, “The Political Economy of Women’s Liberation,” stating that the material basis for discrimination against women will be gone when household work is moved from the private to the public sector. However, Benston argues that without actual freedom from housework, it is likely impossible for true equality to exist in job opportunity. A change to communal eating places, she argues, may simply mean that women are moved from a home kitchen to a communal one, not truly freeing them from the burden of domestic labor.

As feminism became postfeminism, the notion of femininity was "problematized, rather than taken as a given", says Stevi Jackson. The cultural turn of the 1990s aimed to push the boundaries of what the category of "woman" was. Feminists then began to focus on the language of oppression, and materialist feminism lost its prominence.

== Relation to Marxist feminism ==
Marxist feminism is focused on investigating and explaining the ways in which women are oppressed through systems of capitalism and private property. As stated previously, materialist feminism was developed as an improvement upon Marxism, as it was felt that Marxist feminism failed to address division of labor, especially in the household. The current concept has its roots in socialist and Marxist feminism; Rosemary Hennessy and Chrys Ingraham, who are editors of Materialist Feminism: A Reader in Class, Difference, and Women's Lives, describe material feminism as the "conjuncture of several discourses—historical materialism, Marxist and radical feminism, as well as postmodernist and psychoanalytic theories of meaning and subjectivity".

== Theory ==
Christine Delphy affirms that materialism is the only theory of history that views oppression as a basic reality of women's lives, which is why women (and other oppressed groups) need materialism to investigate their situation. For her, "to start from oppression defines a materialist approach, oppression is a materialist concept".

However, the Marxist distinction between production and reproduction is harshly criticized. For materialist feminists, constructing a theory of patriarchy that reduces women's work to reproduction ends up reaffirming the patriarchal ideology. Delphy theorizes two modes of production in our society: industrial and domestic. The first mode allows for capitalist exploitation, while the second allows for familial and patriarchal exploitation. She argues that the domestic mode of production is the material basis of gender oppression, and that marriage is a labor contract that gives men the right to exploit women.

Unlike many Anglophone feminists, who have long relied on a distinction between sex and gender, materialist feminists prefer to talk about social relations of sex (rapports sociaux de sexe). They reject that women's oppression has any natural basis—instead, it is conceived as strictly cultural, and sex assignment would be a means to realize it.

Materialist feminists therefore oppose any discourse that attempts to explain the situation of women by some internal characteristic of this group, in particular those of an anatomical nature, such as the capacity to give birth or a physical weakness of women relative to men, as well as those of a psychological or psychoanalytic nature, which presuppose a different psyche for men and women. A common target of their criticism is what they call néo-féminité: the celebration of femininity proposed by French difference feminism.

== Criticism ==
The relationship between materialism and feminism has been described as "problematic" and regarded as an "unhappy couple". There has also been a concern for the general ambiguity of materialist feminism. It has been called to question whether the differentiation between materialist feminism and Marxist feminism is great enough to be a worthwhile contribution to feminist theory.

Christine Delphy's contributions to materialist feminism have been the subject of criticism, for example by Michèle Barrett and Mary McIntosh. They suggest that the definition of materialism feminism has a very loose interpretation of patriarchy and that Delphy's article "Towards a Materialist Feminism" has a focus limited to the oppression of wives and fails to connect this to the global oppression of women in general.

However, the main criticism for materialist feminism involves the lack of intersectionality within the theory. By focusing on capitalist relations combined with patriarchy, materialist feminism is seen as failing to include women of different classes, sexualities, and ethnicities. Hazel Carby challenged the materialist feminist analyses of the family as universally oppressive to all women. She instead noted the ways that values of the family are different for black women and men, just as the division of labor is also racialized. Rosemary Hennessy commented in the late 1980s on how there had recently been pressure to recognize the differences within the definition of "woman" and how this intersects with not only class, but race, sexualities, and genders.

Stevi Jackson is critical of the recent resurgence of interest in materialist feminism, stating that many of the new ideas were reducing the material to capitalist ideas, and that "this might bring us full circle back to the least productive forms of 1970s Marxism".

In recent years, materialist feminist thoughts have focused on transnational issues. Scholars consider a global economic change in relation to the feminization of poverty. Feminist scholars are also working to create a transnational feminist agenda. For example, Hennessy analyzes grassroots organizations in four maquiladora communities along Mexico's northern border, arguing on the basis of this research that the global nature of patriarchy and capitalism sustains a "political economy of sex".

== Leading figures ==
- Christine Delphy
- Colette Guillaumin
- Rosemary Hennessy
- Stevi Jackson
- Danièle Kergoat
- Diana Leonard
- Nicole-Claude Mathieu
- Monique Plaza
- Paola Tabet
- Monique Wittig

== See also ==
- Antinaturalism
- Criticism of marriage
- Double burden
- Feminist economics
- Feminist metaphysics
- Feminist urbanism
- Social construction of gender
