= Monique Wittig =

French writer (1935–2003)

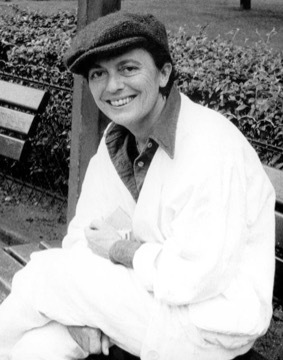
- Wittig in 1985
- Born: 13 July 1935; Dannemarie, Haut-Rhin, France
- Died: 3 January 2003 (aged 67); Tucson, Arizona, U.S.
- Resting place: Père Lachaise Cemetery, Paris
- Education: University of Paris; EHESS
- Occupations: Author, feminist theorist, activist
- Employer: University of Arizona
- Partner: Sande Zeig
- Writing career
- Subjects: Lesbianism, feminism
- Movements: French feminism, radical feminism, materialist feminism, lesbian feminism
- Website: www.moniquewittig.com

Monique Wittig (French: [vitig]; 13 July 1935 – 3 January 2003) was a French author, philosopher, and feminist theorist who wrote about abolition of the sex-class system and coined the phrase "heterosexual contract." Her groundbreaking work is titled The Straight Mind and Other Essays. She published her first novel, L'Opoponax, in 1964. Her second novel, Les Guérillères (1969), was a landmark text in the lesbian feminism canon.

== Biography ==
Monique Wittig was born in 1935 in Dannemarie, Haut-Rhin, France. In 1950, she moved to Paris to study at the Sorbonne. In 1964, she published her first novel, L'Opoponax which won her immediate attention in France and won the Prix Médicis. After the novel was translated into English, Wittig achieved international recognition. She was one of the founders of the Mouvement de libération des femmes (MLF; Women's Liberation Movement). In 1969, she published what is arguably her most influential work, Les Guérillères, which is today considered a revolutionary and controversial source for feminist and lesbian thinkers around the world. Its publication is also considered to be the founding event of French feminism.

Wittig earned her PhD from the School for Advanced Studies in the Social Sciences, after completing a thesis titled "Le Chantier littéraire" under Gérard Genette. Wittig was a central figure in lesbian and feminist movements in France.

In 1971, she was a founding member of the Gouines rouges ("Red Dykes"), the first lesbian group in Paris. She was also involved in the Féministes Révolutionnaires ("Revolutionary feminists"), a radical feminist group. She published various other works, some of which include the 1973 Le Corps lesbien (or The Lesbian Body) and the 1976 Brouillon pour un dictionnaire des amantes (or Lesbian Peoples: Material for a Dictionary), which her partner, Sande Zeig, coauthored.

In 1976, Wittig and Zeig left France due to certain MLF members who sought to "paralyse and destroy lesbian groups." Wittig's attempts to create a lesbian-specific group within the radical branch of the MLF was met with resistance; "they almost succeeded in completely destroying me, and they have, yes, chased me out of Paris". Wittig and Zeig moved to the United States where Wittig focused on developing gender studies. Her works, ranging from the philosophical essay The Straight Mind to parables such as Les Tchiches et les Tchouches, explored the interconnectedness and intersection of lesbianism, feminism, and literary form. With various editorial positions both in France and in the United States, Wittig's works became internationally recognized and were commonly published in both French and English. She continued to work as a visiting professor in various universities across the nation, including the University of California, Berkeley, Vassar College and the University of Arizona in Tucson. She taught a course in materialist thought through Women's Studies programs, wherein her students were immersed in the process of correcting the American translation of The Lesbian Body. She died of a heart attack on January 3, 2003.

== Writing style ==
Wittig had a materialist approach in her works (evident in Les Guérillères). She also demonstrated a very critical theoretical approach (evident in her essay, "One Is Not Born a Woman").

As a lesbian writer adamantly opposed to any notion of an inherently feminine writing, Wittig has most often been placed either in opposition to Hélène Cixous, or in a tradition of lesbian writers. Her ties to de Beauvoir and Sarraute are, however, equally significant, and position her work within a double history of feminism and avant-garde literature of the last half of the twentieth century. Like Duras and Cixous, she develops her work to a rethinking of women's experience in writing, while her staunch opposition to a notion of "difference" that would be based on sexuality or biology aligns her more with de Beauvoir and Sarraute.

Wittig also emphasized the role of language in shaping reality. She used innovative literary techniques, such as split pronouns (e.g., "j/e" in Le Corps lesbien), to challenge the binary logic of gender and to create new forms of subjectivity.

== Theoretical views ==
Wittig's essays call into question some of the basic premises of contemporary feminist theory. Wittig was one of the first feminist theorists to interrogate heterosexuality as not just sexuality, but as a political regime. Defining herself as a radical lesbian, she and other lesbians during the early 1980s in France and Quebec reached a consensus that "radical lesbianism" posits heterosexuality as a political regime that must be overthrown. Wittig criticized contemporary feminism for not questioning this heterosexual political regime and believed that contemporary feminism proposed to rearrange rather than eliminate the system. While a critique of heterosexuality as a "political institution" had been laid by certain lesbian separatists in the United States, American lesbian separatism did not posit heterosexuality as a regime to be overthrown. Rather, the aim was to develop within an essentialist framework new lesbian values within lesbian communities.

Wittig was a theorist of materialist feminism. She believed that it is the historical task of feminists to define oppression in materialist terms. It is necessary to make clear that women are a class, and to recognize the category of "woman" as well as the category of "man" as political and economic categories. Wittig acknowledges that these two social classes exist because of the social relationship between men and women. However, women as a class will disappear when man as a class disappears. Just as there are no slaves without masters, there are no women without men. The category of sex is the political category that founds society as heterosexual. The category of "man" and "woman" exists only in a heterosexual system, and to destroy the heterosexual system will end the categories of men and women.

Wittig's work has had a significant impact on feminist and queer theory, though her relationship to these fields is complex. While some see her as a precursor to queer theory, others argue that her materialist approach sets her apart from more recent developments in the field.

== Notable works ==
=== Les Guérillères ===
Les Guérillères, published in 1969, five years after Wittig's first novel, revolves around the elles, women warriors who have created their own sovereign state by overthrowing the patriarchal world. The novel is structured through a series of prose poems. "Elles are not 'the women' – a mistranslation that often surfaces in David Le Vay's English rendition – but rather the universal 'they,' a linguistic assault on the masculine collective pronoun ils." The novel initially describes the world that the elles have created and ends with members recounting the days of war that led to the sovereign state.

=== The Straight Mind ===
In the first essay of the collection, titled The Category of Sex, Wittig theorizes the class nature of sex oppression, favouring a social constructionist rather than biological essentialist view of the dialect between the sexes.

For there is no sex. There is but sex that is oppressed and sex that oppresses. It is oppression that creates sex and not the contrary. The contrary would be to say that sex creates oppression, or to say that the cause (origin) of oppression is to be found in sex itself, in a natural division of the sexes preexisting (or outside of) society.

While Wittig depicted only women in her literature, she abhorred the idea that she was a "women's writer." Monique Wittig called herself a "radical lesbian."

There is no such thing as women literature for me, that does not exist. In literature, I do not separate women and men. One is a writer, or one is not. This is a mental space where sex is not determining. One has to have some space for freedom. Language allows this. This is about building an idea of the neutral which could escape sexuality.

In "Point of View: Universal or Particular?", she states that gender "is the linguistic index of the political opposition between the sexes." Only one gender exists: the feminine, the masculine not being a gender. The masculine is not the masculine but the general, as the masculine experience is normalized over the experience of the feminine. Feminine is the concrete as denoted through sex in language, whereas only the masculine as general is the abstract. Wittig lauds Djuna Barnes and Marcel Proust for universalizing the feminine by making no gendered difference in the way they describe characters. As taking the point of view of a lesbian, Wittig finds it necessary to suppress genders in the same way Djuna Barnes cancels out genders by making them obsolete.

Moreover, for Wittig, the social or gender category "woman" exists only through its relation to the social category "man," and the "women" without relation to "men" would cease to exist, leaving individuals freed from social constructs and categories dictating behavior or norms. She advocated a strong universalist position, saying that the expression of one's identity and the liberation of desire require the abolition of gender categories.

Wittig identified herself as a radical lesbian. In her work The Straight Mind, she argued that lesbians are not women because to be a lesbian is to step outside of the heterosexual norm of women, as defined by men for men's ends.

...and it would be incorrect to say that lesbians associate, make love, live with women, for 'woman' has meaning only in heterosexual systems of thought and heterosexual economic systems. Lesbians are not women (1978).

Wittig also developed a critical view of Marxism which obstructed feminist struggle, but also of feminism itself which does not question the heterosexual dogma.

A theorist of materialist feminism, she stigmatised the myth of "the woman," called heterosexuality a political regime, and outlined the basis for a social contract which lesbians refuse.

== Reception and influence ==
Wittig is a major influence in Judith Butler's classic Gender Trouble. However, Butler identifies a "metaphysics of presence" in Wittig’s theory (a Derridean critique), suggesting that it presupposes a pre-discursive, humanist subject – an idea Butler rejects as essentialist.

Linda Zerilli states that Wittig's work challenges traditional, male-dominated notions of universalism by deconstructing the heterosexual framework that underpins societal and linguistic structures. Contra Butler, Zerilli suggests that the universalization of the lesbian subject is strategic, aimed at exposing the contradictions inherent in traditional notions of the universal subject.

For Teresa de Lauretis, Wittig's work helped distinguish lesbian theory from feminist theory by conceptualizing lesbians as an "eccentric subject" existing outside the heterosexual framework. She argues that Wittig’s ideas, though sometimes misunderstood – referring especially to Butler – anticipated later developments in queer and postcolonial theory. De Lauretis also emphasizes Wittig’s lasting influence, as contemporary gender studies increasingly move beyond fixed identity categories, inadvertently realizing Wittig’s vision.

Brad Epps and Jonathan Katz argue that Wittig’s materialist approach and radical critique remain relevant, particularly in the context of contemporary debates about queer theory and the politics of identity. They also draw parallels between Wittig and the thinkers of the Frankfurt School.

== Bibliography ==
=== Novels ===
- Wittig, Monique (1964). L'Opoponax. Paris: Union générale d'éditions. OCLC 299952008. (Winner of the Prix Médicis.)
- Wittig, Monique (1971). Les guérillères. New York: Viking Press. ISBN 9780670424634.
- Wittig, Monique (1973). Le corps lesbien [The lesbian body]. Paris: Les éditions de Minuit. ISBN 9782707300973.
- Wittig, Monique; Zeig, Sande (1976). Brouillon pour un dictionnaire des amantes [Lesbian Peoples: Material for a Dictionary]. Paris: Grasset. ISBN 9782246004011.
- Wittig, Monique (1985). Virgile, non [Across the Acheron]. Paris: Les éditions de Minuit. ISBN 9782707310217.
- Wittig, Monique (1999). Paris-la-politique et autres histoires. Paris: P.O.L. ISBN 9782867446979.

=== Plays ===
- Wittig, Monique (1967). L'amant vert. (Unpublished.)
- Wittig, Monique (1972). Le grand-cric-jules. (Radio Stuttgart.)
- Wittig, Monique (1972). Récréation. (Radio Stuttgart.)
- Wittig, Monique (1972). Dialogue pour les deux frères et la soeur. (Radio Stuttgart.)
- Wittig, Monique (1985). Le Voyage sans fin. Paris. (Vlasta 4 supplement.)

=== Short fiction ===
Most collected in Paris-la-Politique. Paris: P.O.L., 1999

- Wittig, Monique (1965). "Banlieues". Nouveau Commerce. 5: 113–117.
- Wittig, Monique (1967). "Voyage: Yallankoro". Nouveau Commerce. 177: 558–563.
- Wittig, Monique (1973). "Une partie de campagne". Nouveau Commerce. 26: 13–31.
- Wittig, Monique (1978). "Un jour mon prince viendra". Questions Féministes. 2: 31–39.
- Wittig, Monique (1983). "Les Tchiches et les Tchouches". Le Genre Humaine. 6: 136–147.
- Wittig, Monique (1985). "Paris-la-Politique". Vlasta. 4: 8–35.

=== Translations ===
- Barnes, Djuna (1982). La passion [Spillway and other stories]. Monica Wittig (translator). Paris: Flammarion. ISBN 9782080644602.
- Marcuse, Herbert (1968). L'Homme unidimensionnel: essai sur l'idéologie de la société industrielle avancée [One dimensional man]. Monica Wittig (translator). Paris: Les éditions de minuit. ISBN 9782707303738.
- Barreno, Maria; Horta, Teresa; Velho Da Costa, Fatima (1975). Novas cartas portuguesas [The Three Marias: New Portuguese Letters]. Monica Wittig (translator), Evelyne Le Garrec (translator) and Vera Prado (translator). Garden City, New York: Doubleday. ISBN 9780385018531.

=== Essays and criticisms ===
Most collected in La Pensée straight, Paris: Balland, 2001 (trans. by the author and Sam Bourcier) and in The Straight Mind and Other Essays, Boston: Beacon Press, 1992

- Wittig, Monique (1967). "A propos de "Bouvard et Pécuchet"". Cahiers de la Compagnie Madeleine Renaud-Barrault Jean Louis Barrault. 59: 113–122.
- Wittig, Monique (1979), "Paradigm", in Stambolian, George; Marks, Elaine (eds.), Homosexualities and French literature: cultural contexts, critical texts, Ithaca, New York: Cornell University Press, pp. 114–121, ISBN 9780801497667.
- Wittig, Monique (February 1980). "La pensée straight" [The straight mind]. Questions Féministes. 7 (7). Nouvelles Questions Féministes & Questions Feministes: 45–53. JSTOR 40619186.

Reprinted as: Wittig, Monique (1985). "La pensée straight" [The straight mind]. Amazones d'Hier, Lesbiennes d'Aujourd'hui (AHLA) (Amazons of Yesterday, Lesbians of Today). 3 (4): 5–18.

- Wittig, Monique (March 1980). "The straight mind". Feminist Issues. 1 (1): 103–111. doi:10.1007/BF02685561. S2CID 145139565.
- Wittig, Monique (May 1980). "On ne naît pas femme" [One is not born a woman]. Questions Féministes. 8 (8). Nouvelles Questions Féministes & Questions Feministes: 75–84. JSTOR 40619199.

Reprinted as: Wittig, Monique (1985). "On ne naît pas femme" [One is not born a woman]. Amazones d'Hier, Lesbiennes d'Aujourd'hui (AHLA) (Amazons of Yesterday, Lesbians of Today). 4 (1): 103–118.

- Wittig, Monique (1982), "'Avant-note' pour La Passion", in Barnes, Djuna (ed.), La Passion [Spillway and other stories], Monica Wittig (translator), Paris: Flammarion, ISBN 9782080644602.
- Wittig, Monique (June 1982). "The category of sex". Feminist Issues. 2 (2): 63–68. doi:10.1007/BF02685553. S2CID 143976036.
- Wittig, Monique (1983). "Les questions féministes ne sont pas des questions lesbiennes". Amazones d'Hier, Lesbiennes d'Aujourd'hui (AHLA) (Amazons of Yesterday, Lesbians of Today). 2 (1): 10–14.
- Wittig, Monique (June 1983). "The point of view: universal or particular?". Feminist Issues. 3 (2): 63–69. doi:10.1007/BF02685543. S2CID 144469624.

Translation of: Wittig, Monique (1982), ""Avant-note" for La Passion", in Barnes, Djuna (ed.), La passion [Spillway and other stories], Monica Wittig (translator), Paris: Flammarion, ISBN 9782080644602.

- Wittig, Monique (1984). "Le lieu de l'action" [The place of action]. Digraphe. 32. Galilee: 69–75.
- Wittig, Monique (June 1984). "The Trojan horse". Feminist Issues. 4 (2): 45–49. doi:10.1007/BF02685548. S2CID 144972952.

Reprinted as: Wittig, Monique (1985). "Le cheval de troie". Vlasta. 4: 36–41.

- Wittig, Monique (June 1985). "The mark of gender". Feminist Issues. 5 (2): 3–12. doi:10.1007/BF02685575. S2CID 143836425.

Reprinted as: Wittig, Monique (1986), "The mark of gender", in Miller, Nancy K. (ed.), The poetics of gender, New York: Columbia University Press, pp. 63–73, ISBN 9780231063111.

- Wittig, Monique (1986), "The place of action", in Oppenheim, Lois (ed.), Three decades of the French new novel, Lois Oppenheim (translator) and Evelyne Costa de Beauregard (translator), Urbana: University of Illinois Press, pp. 132–140, ISBN 9780252011580.
- Wittig, Monique (March 1989). "On the social contract". Feminist Issues. 9 (1): 3–12. doi:10.1007/BF02685600. S2CID 144993071.
- Wiitig, Monique (March 1990). "Homo Sum". Feminist Issues 10, 3–11. doi.org/10.1007/BF02686514
- Wittig, Monique (Winter 1994). "Quelques remarques sur Les Guérillères". L'Esprit Créateur. 34 (4). Johns Hopkins University Press: 116–122. doi:10.1353/esp.1994.0008. S2CID 164366979.
- Wittig, Monique (1996), "The straight mind", in Jackson, Stevi; Scott, Sue (eds.), Feminism and sexuality: a reader, New York: Columbia University Press, pp. 144–149, ISBN 9780231107082.
- Wittig, Monique (March 1996). ""The Constant Journey": an introduction and a prefatory note". Modern Drama. 39 (1): 156–159. doi:10.3138/md.39.1.156. S2CID 191356034.
- Wittig, Monique (15 July 1996). "Lacunary films". New Statesman. 102. Progressive Media International.
- Wittig, Monique (Summer 1996). "Le déambulatoire. entretien avec Nathalie Sarraute" [The ambulatory: interview with Nathalie Sarraute]. L'Esprit Créateur. 36 (2): 3–8. doi:10.1353/esp.0.0053. S2CID 161343982. Alternative version.
- Wittig, Monique (Summer 1996). "Avatar". L'Esprit Créateur. 36 (2): 109–116. doi:10.1353/esp.0.0097. S2CID 246015149. Alternative version.
- Wittig, Monique (1997), "L'ordre du poème", in Cardy, Michael; Evans, George; Jacobs, Gabriel (eds.), Narrative voices in modern French fiction: studies in honour of Valerie Minogue on the occasion of her retirement, Cardiff: University of Wales Press, pp. 7–12, ISBN 9780708313947.
- Wittig, Monique (1997), "One is not born a woman", in Nicholson, Linda (ed.), The second wave: a reader in feminist theory, New York: Routledge, pp. 265–271, ISBN 9780415917612.
- Wittig, Monique (2005), "Some Remarks on "Les Guérillères"", in Shaktini, Namascar (ed.), On Monique Wittig: theoretical, political, and literary essays, Urbana: University of Illinois Press, pp. 37–43, ISBN 9780252072314.
- Wittig, Monique (2005), "Some Remarks on "The Lesbian Body"", in Shaktini, Namascar (ed.), On Monique Wittig: theoretical, political, and literary essays, Urbana: University of Illinois Press, pp. 44–48, ISBN 9780252072314.

== See also ==
- Feminism in France
- Amazones d'Hier, Lesbiennes d'Aujourd'hui
- Double burden
- Economic materialism
- Feminist economics
- Stevi Jackson
- Christine Delphy
- Rosemary Hennessy
