= LGBTQ history in France =

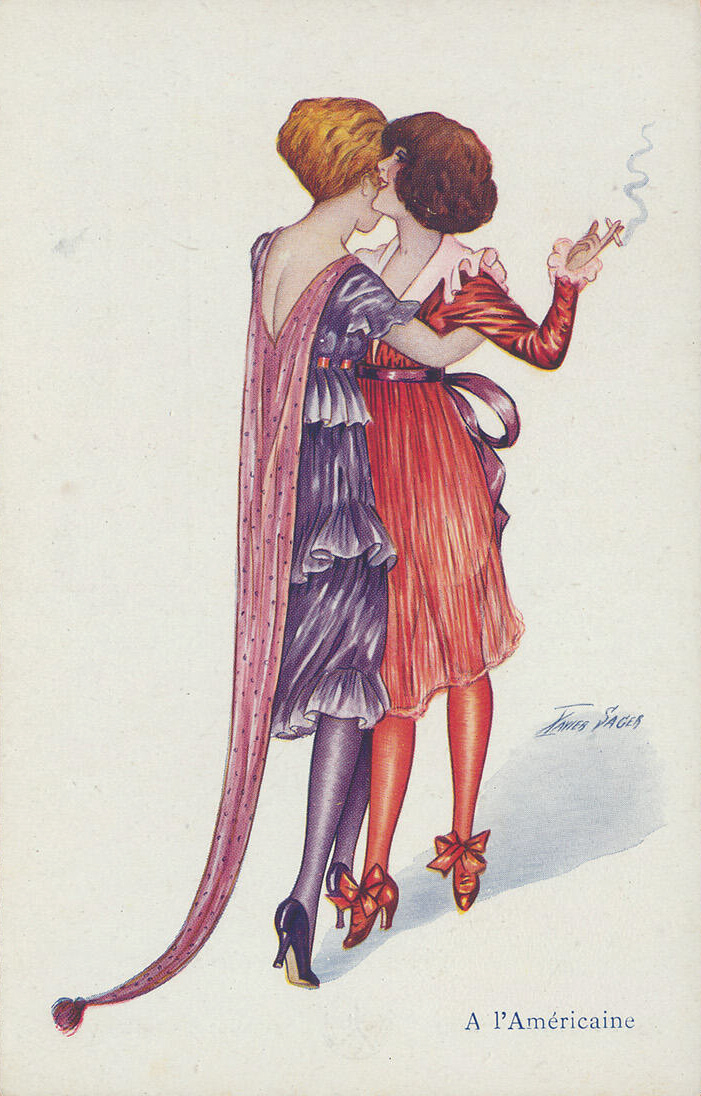
Women dancing as a couple, postcard from 1930 by Xavier Sager.

The history of LGBTQ people in France covers the social, political, and cultural history of lesbian, gay, bisexual, transgender, intersex, and queer individuals in France and how French institutions and society have interacted with them.

Initially marked by severe legal and religious condemnation, sometimes leading to death, particularly affecting the Third Estate more than the aristocracy, the French Revolution ended the criminalization of homosexual practices. However, under the Napoleonic Empires, repression took new forms: discreet and police-driven under Napoleon I, it was coupled with medical condemnation under Napoleon III. Despite this, a homosexual and cross-dressing sociability and culture emerged by the late 19th century, particularly in Paris. This relative freedom did not extend to the colonies, where France maintained a sexual order to support colonial rule.

The French LGBT community became more structured throughout the 20th century, with distinctions between cross-dressing and transsexuality emerging in the 1960s, alongside the creation of transgender associations and the first political demands and demonstrations in the 1970s. These efforts led to the establishment of the Pride parades in France and significant theoretical contributions to international Lesbian feminism through the work of Monique Wittig.

While LGBT individuals in France achieved the end of homosexual registration and discrimination based on the age of consent in 1982, the late 20th century was heavily impacted by the HIV/AIDS epidemic. It was not until 1999 that the Civil solidarity pact (PACS) was introduced, followed by the legalization of Same-sex marriage in France in 2013.

== Middle ages ==
In the 13th century France, sodomy resulted in castration on the first offense, dismemberment on the second, and burning on the third. Lesbian behavior was punished with specific mutilations for the first two offenses and burning on the third as well.

== Early modern period ==
=== Conceptions of homosexuality ===
==== Theological, legal, and moral condemnation ====
Enlightenment philosophers such as Voltaire, Condorcet, and Montesquieu argued against the penalization of homosexuality, though their opposition was often paired with moral condemnation, criticizing legal penalties as less effective than social disapproval. Some, like Diderot and Théophile de Bordeu, argued that homosexual acts should not be condemned as they merely provided pleasure to participants. Historian Bryant T. Ragan Jr. suggests that frequent negative associations between homosexuality and philosophers by Enlightenment critics limited their defense of homosexuality, fearing accusations of being homosexual themselves. For example, Voltaire and d'Alembert faced such accusations, with homosexuality labeled as "Socratic love" or "the philosophers' vice."

Homophobic thought relied on theological, legal, and social arguments.

Theologically, homosexuality was linked to heresy. The pornographic novel Thérèse philosophe refers to homosexuals as "heretics", and the term "bougre", commonly used for gay men, derived from the 12th century term for Bulgarians, seen as both heretics and sodomites. This association was so strong that, from the Reformation to the late, Protestants like Pierre Jurieu accused Catholic priests of homosexual relations. Anti-clerical figures, such as Voltaire in Candide, echoed this, fostering a pornographic imaginary of monasteries as sites of gay and lesbian debauchery, as seen in Mirabeau's Erotika Biblion. Homosexuality was often described indirectly as "the most notorious vice" or "the abomination of abominations", as theologians believed naming it explicitly might encourage its practice.

Jurists, however, explicitly condemned homosexuality, using "sodomite" to refer to both anal sex and same-sex relations, clearly targeting the latter as a crime. Homosexuality was also seen as a violation of natural laws. François Bernier, for instance, erroneously believed homosexuality was unique to humans, deeming it a perversion. This view naturalized heterosexuality, with literature celebrating male-female attraction as self-evident, while homosexual relations were deemed harmful to health. Diderot challenged this in D'Alembert's Dream, arguing that homosexual acts, being practiced by humans, are part of human nature.

This period also saw the fetishization of lesbianism as a pornographic subject for heterosexual male audiences.

==== Homosexuality as a social construct ====
Some philosophers viewed homosexuality not as a sin or individual trait but as a result of societal organization, a social construct. This led to varied moral conclusions. Some, like Montesquieu, criticized social practices fostering homosexuality, such as harems in Persian Letters, nude sports in ancient Greece, or boys' boarding schools in The Spirit of the Laws. Similarly, Diderot critiqued convents in The Nun.

Helvétius, in On Man, argued that the acceptance of homosexuality ("Greek love") in societies like ancient Greece, Peru, or Japanese Buddhist monasteries suggested a need to compare moral laws across societies to identify universal principles.

==== Emergence of homosexuality as an identity and culture ====
Between the 1700s and 1720s, male homosexuality began to be seen not as a behavior anyone might engage in but as a distinct identity. The term "sodomite" started to describe a way of being, perceived as more effeminate than heterosexual men, and was embraced by some as an identity. Similarly, by the 1780s, "sapphic" and "tribade" denoted lesbians, seen as more masculine than heterosexual women.

This shift framed homosexual attraction as excluding heterosexual attraction, moving away from earlier views of it as a form of bisexuality. In Louis-Charles Fougeret de Monbron's The Cosmopolite, Muslim men are depicted as frequently bisexual, contrasting with Christian societies where such orientation was considered rare. Mirabeau's defense of homosexuality, invoking Plato's androgynes, posited that some beings were originally same-sex pairs, explaining lesbians and gay men but rendering bisexuality incomprehensible.

This emerging identity fostered a male homosexual community and gay culture, particularly in Paris. Sodomites adopted effeminate mannerisms, feminine nicknames, and informal address. Cruising developed in public spaces associated with prostitution, such as the Seine riverbanks, northern boulevards, and the Tuileries Garden, Luxembourg Gardens, and Palais-Royal Garden. Many cabarets served as places for socializing and sexual activity in the 18th century, particularly the Petit-Trianon, the Tour d'Argent, the Croix d'Or, the Roi des Laboureurs, and the Franck Pinot. A specific vocabulary emerged: "sodomite" was general, "giton" denoted a solely passive partner, and "bardache" a young passive man with older partners.

=== Legal and police repression of homosexuality ===
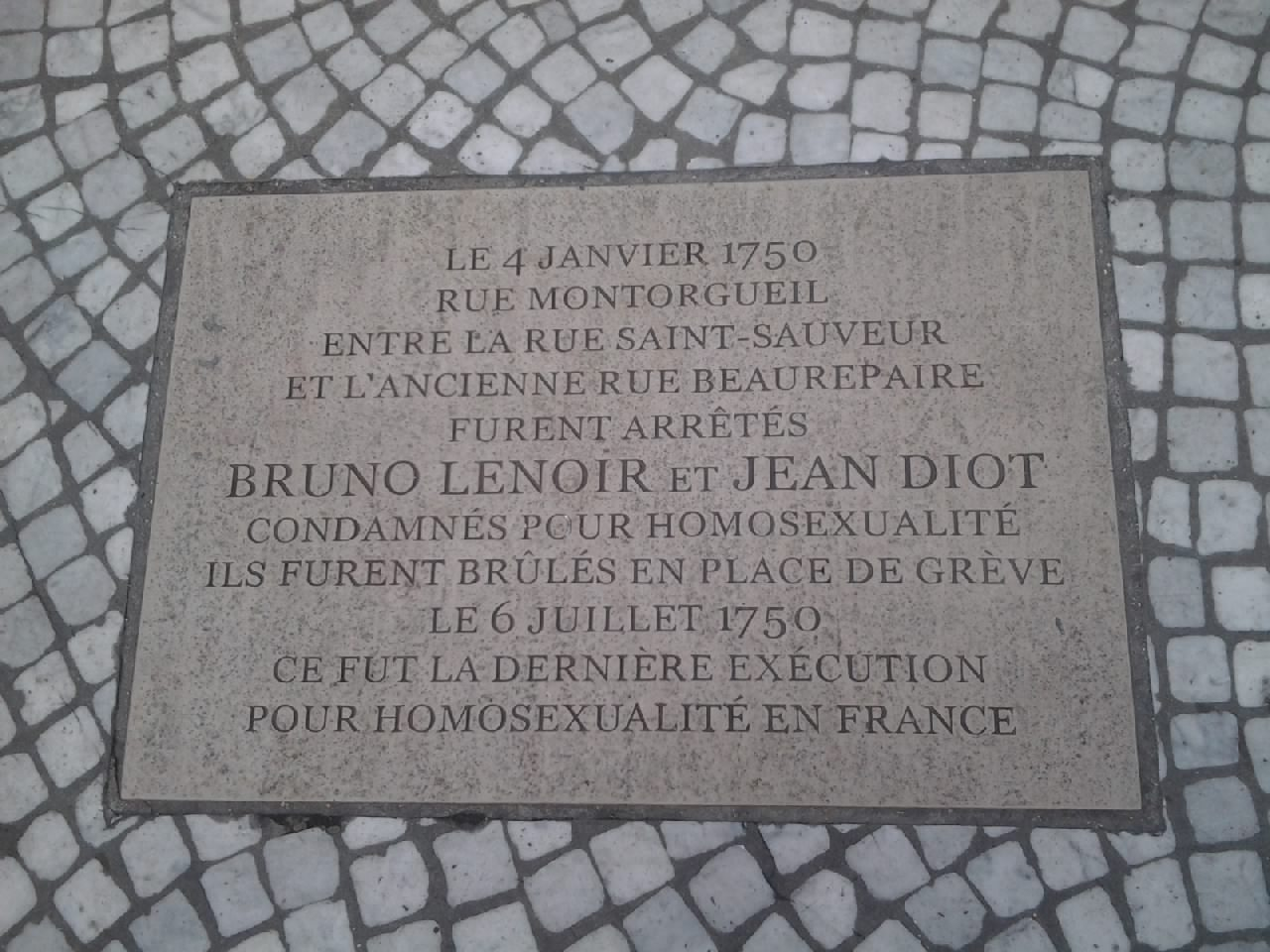
Plaque on Rue Montorgueil honoring Jean Diot and Bruno Lenoir, the last individuals executed in France for homosexuality in 1750.

Despite social condemnation, legal repression of homosexual behavior gradually decreased. In the Ancien Régime, there was a gap between harsh legal penalties and their actual enforcement: by the early, homosexual acts typically resulted in only brief imprisonment. The police used "mouches" (informants), often recruited from prisoners, to pose as individuals seeking sex in cruising areas to catch offenders in the act. Hundreds of men were arrested annually.

In 1725, the Deschauffours affair—a network abducting young boys for sale to aristocrats and clergy—further tarnished homosexuality's public image. This led to the execution of Jean Diot and Bruno Lenoir in 1750 for a simple public sexual act, marking them as the last individuals executed for homosexuality in France.

Between 1714 and 1783, five other sodomites were executed, but their homosexuality was an aggravating factor in crimes like murder or rape. Overall, the 18th century in France was characterized by a differentiated treatment of male homosexuality: the aristocracy benefited from the leniency of judges in court rulings for "sodomy offenses", while the third estate carried out its sentences.

According to Antoine Idier, this relative legal leniency reflected a shift toward police-based repression. In 1670, an appendix to the Criminal Ordinance allowed police to pursue sodomy not as a crime but as a public order and safety violation. Thus, although 1726 marks the last recorded imprisonment for sodomy in the Bastille, thousands of men were arrested by the police during the 18th century for questioning about homosexual practices. From the 1780s, Parisian police established "pederasty patrols" to monitor cruising areas and track known sodomites. These practices continued after the decriminalization of sodomy, with judges relying on charges like indecent exposure.

Antoine Idier's 2025 analysis contradicts historian Jean-Louis Flandrin's 1981 thesis, which argued that homosexual behaviors were too common to be prosecuted and posed less threat to social order than out-of-wedlock births.

=== Expressions of cross-dressing ===
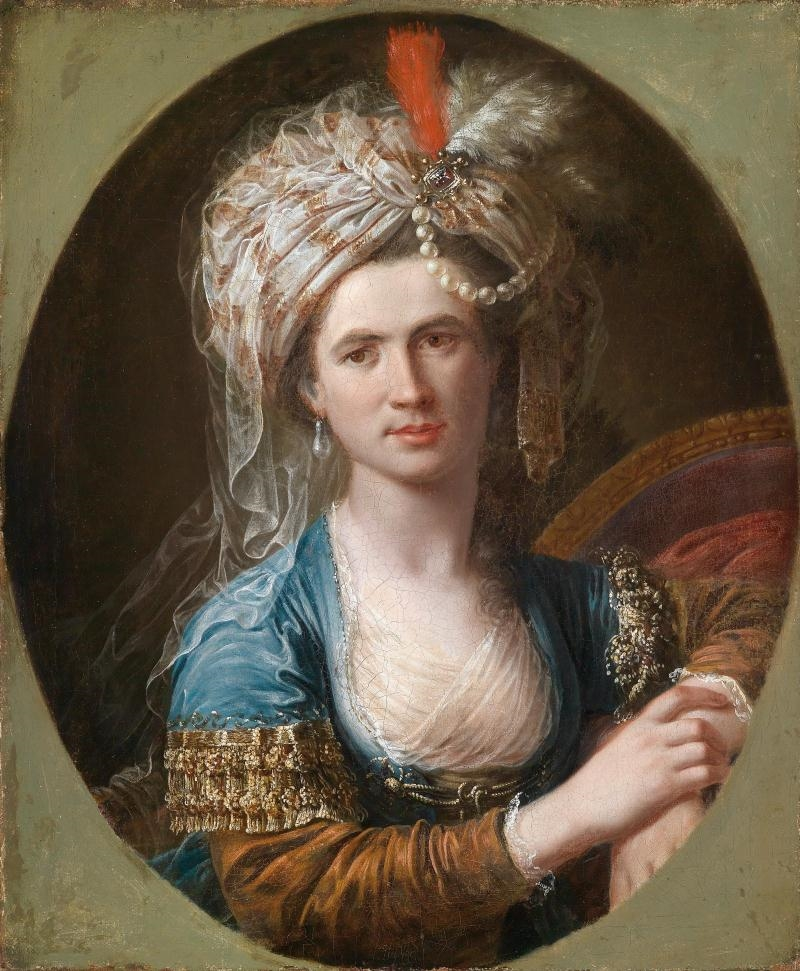
Portrait of the Chevalière d'Éon, created around 1775.

Around 1775, the Chevalière d'Éon, a diplomat for Louis XV at the English court who lived as a man for 49 years, began dressing as a woman until her death in 1810. Modern perspectives view her as either a cross-dresser, an intersex person, or a transgender woman.

== From the Revolutionary period to 1890 ==
=== Revolutionary period ===
The revolutionary period saw a decrease in arrests for sodomy, which Antoine Idier attributes to a general reduction in police activity rather than a specific change in attitudes toward homosexuality.

Without specific debate, the offense of sodomy was removed from the 1791 Penal Code. François Atreyu suggests this was less about increased tolerance and more due to secularization, Enlightenment philosophy, and French Revolution ideals, as sodomy was decriminalized alongside blasphemy, sacrilege, heresy, and magic. Following this decriminalization, the Municipal and Correctional Police Code introduced offenses like public indecency and incitement of youth to debauchery, used to discreetly repress homosexuality and confine it to the private sphere.

Fureurs utérines de Marie-Antoinette, anti-monarchist pamphlet of 1791

The court soon adopted the fashion;
Each woman was at once a tribade and a courtesan:
Children were no longer born; this seemed convenient,
The penis was replaced by a libertine finger.

Homosexuality and bisexuality were used in politico-pornographic pamphlets to depict the aristocracy's perversion and illegitimacy, particularly targeting Marie-Antoinette. Accusations of "tribadism" with Countess de Polignac and Princess de Lamballe were mixed with charges of nymphomania. Supporters of the constitutional monarchy portrayed de Polignac as a seductress victimizing the queen, while anti-monarchists emphasized the queen's active role to heighten her guilt. This period also saw new stigma against men taking a passive role in homosexual relations, viewed as impotent and emasculated. Accusations of lesbianism were also used to discredit revolutionary and women's rights advocate Théroigne de Méricourt.

=== Napoleonic period ===
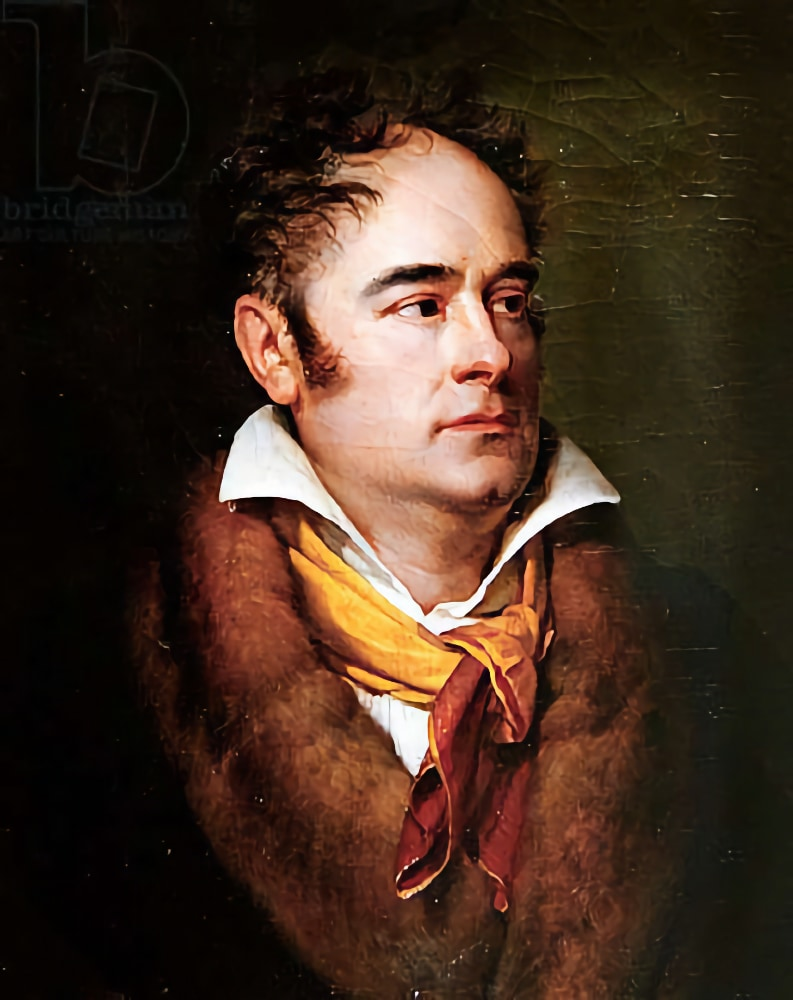
Joseph Fiévée, a senior official and secret agent, who openly lived with his male partner, the poet Théodore Leclercq.

The 1810 Penal Code did not reinstate the offense of homosexuality but retained charges of public indecency and incitement to debauchery, adding outrage to public decency. Napoleon I's policy toward male homosexuality was generally repressive. While he instructed his Justice Minister not to prosecute two pederasts [sic] attacked in 1805, believing public trials would be counterproductive by publicizing such relations, he favored discreet and effective police action. Consequently, homosexual men were imprisoned without conviction or expelled from their residences. Napoleon also ordered his Archchancellor, Jean-Jacques-Régis de Cambacérès, to publicly maintain a mistress to counter rumors of his homosexuality. He attributed the perceived low prevalence of homosexuality in France to the beauty of French women. Despite this, some of his associates, like prefect Joseph Fiévée, openly lived with his partner Théodore Leclercq.

Without a specific homosexuality offense, police and courts used two tactics: charging public homosexual acts with indecency and accusing partners of "mutually corrupting" each other under incitement to debauchery. This repression targeted not only public acts but also men sharing households.

This police approach aligned with societal condemnation. On March 25, 1792, volunteers raided the Tuileries Garden to apprehend homosexuals for authorities. Similar incidents occurred in Chartres, Issoudun, and Valence, where small homosexual communities had formed. Perpetrators of these attacks faced no prosecution, unlike their victims.

The Chartres community developed its own slang, calling women "grease cans" and heterosexual men "side stitches".

=== Restoration, July Monarchy, Second Republic, and Second Empire ===
==== 1815–1848 ====
During the Second Restoration, Jenny Savalette de Lange emerged. Post-mortem examinations led some to view her as a lifelong cross-dressing man or a man-woman [sic], while others see her as one of France's first transgender women.

The July Monarchy was a period of revitalized gender and sexual fluidity, as illustrated in Théophile Gautier's novel Mademoiselle de Maupin. The protagonist displays a genderfluid identity, presenting as both man and woman, falling in love with the cross-dressing knight Théodore de Sérannes, who is revealed to be a woman, and ultimately engaging in relationships with both the protagonist and his mistress. Themes of homosexuality, cross-dressing, and intersexuality (then called "hermaphroditism") were popular, as seen in works like Henri de Latouche's Fragoletta and Balzac's Sarrasine, Séraphîta, The Girl with the Golden Eyes, Le Père Goriot, Vautrin, and Splendeurs et misères des courtisanes. However, this fluidity was often portrayed as a transitional phase toward a "natural" heterosexuality.

Terms like "lorette" (a woman frequently cross-dressing as a man) and "tante" (a man engaging in homosexual relations in prison but heterosexual outside) emerged. Homosexual relations flourished in the French Guiana penal colony, including consensual relationships, prostitution, and rape.

Despite greater social acceptance, homosexual relations among marginalized groups were policed to prevent disruption of the social order. This fear led to arguments for individual prison cells and, in July 1843, a ban on Parisian prostitutes sharing apartments.

==== 1848–1870 ====
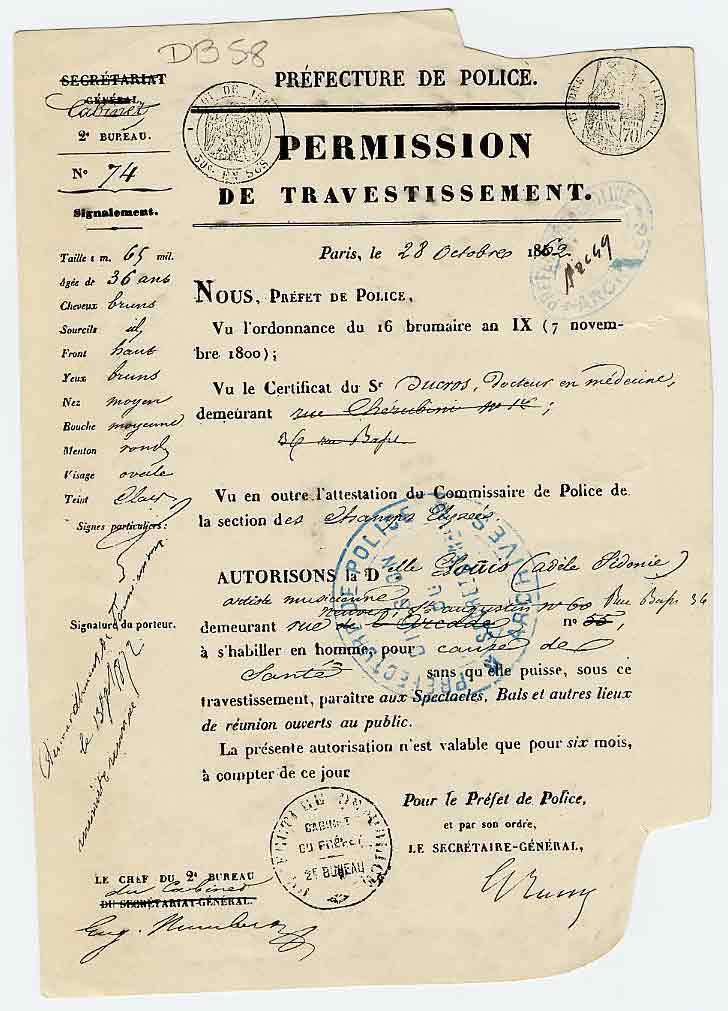
Cross-dressing permit issued by the Paris police prefecture, 1862.

The Second Empire saw a rigidification of social gender roles, replacing the July Monarchy's fluidity with strict distinctions between active and passive roles and between heterosexuality and homosexuality. New terms like "pédéraste" and "antiphysique" for gay men and "lesbienne" for homosexual women emerged.

Historian Victoria Thompson attributes this to reinforced class barriers, as the bourgeoisie consolidated power and suppressed the worker ideals of the June Days uprising. Literature, such as Ernest Feydeau's La Comtesse de Chalis, ou les mœurs du jour, and medical discourse condemned same-sex relations across class lines as particularly scandalous. A police inspector described a respectable homosexual couple: two men of the same class, different ages, acting as friends publicly, with the younger adopting a feminine role, including cross-dressing, at home.

Cross-dressing was banned, enabling police to target lesbians deemed too masculine.

Male prostitution in Paris saw the rise of blackmail schemes, where a prostitute's accomplice posed as a police officer threatening arrest, extracting bribes to avoid social ruin. This practice, described in Joseph Méry's Monsieur Auguste, linked homosexuality with criminality in the public mind.

Repression intensified due to strengthened police authority, particularly the morals police, and the emergence of medical condemnation. Ambroise Tardieu's Étude médicale sur les attentats aux mœurs generalized from pedophilic rapes to depict all homosexual men as inherently unhealthy and criminal. He denied bisexuality, claiming only heterosexuals in deprived contexts or homosexuals maintaining a heterosexual facade existed. This laid the groundwork for the concept of sexual orientation, focusing on desires rather than behaviors, and distinguished between active and passive homosexual men. This medical condemnation led to internments. The pathologization of homosexuality was particularly pronounced for women, both in reality and fiction, as seen in La Comtesse de Chalis and Adolphe Belot's Mademoiselle Giraud, ma femme, where lesbian characters die of mental illness.

Conversely, lesbian relationships among prostitutes became normalized, seen as a natural response to daily exposure to men's flaws. Such a tragic relationship is depicted in Théodore de Banville's Les Parisiennes de Paris. Zola in Nana and La Curée, and Baudelaire in Les Femmes Damnées, used lesbianism to illustrate the moral corruption of bourgeois men unable to love their wives, driving them to women via prostitution.

In 1863, Frenchwoman Marie-Antoinette Lix heroically participated in the January 1863 Uprising by cross-dressing as a man named Tony.

== Third republic ==
=== 1870–1920 ===
==== Homosexual life ====
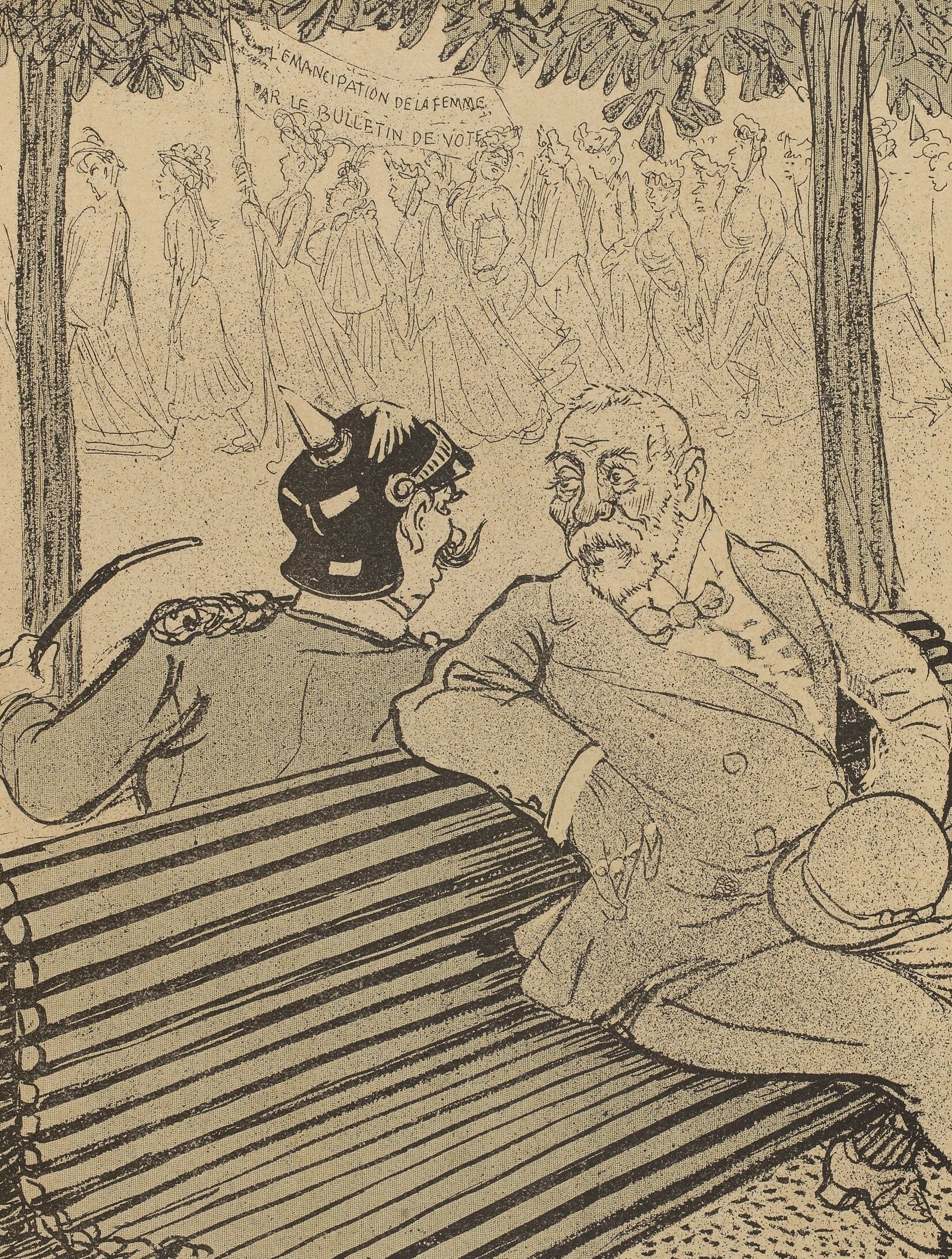
Caricature of the Harden–Eulenburg affair published in June 1908 in the weekly L'Assiette au beurre. The artist places the male couple in a public garden reminiscent of Parisian parks, key sites for homosexual encounters at the time.

Parisian gay cruising areas continued to expand, fostering a unified community where individuals knew each other. Existing venues were joined by urinals along the Champs-Élysées and Place de la Bourse, as well as bathhouses. Homosexual balls were held in cafés, restaurants, and bars, under police surveillance with frequent raids. Male prostitution shifted to city passages like Jouffroy, des Panoramas, and Verdeau. William A. Peniston notes the difficulty for historians in distinguishing prostitution from consensual relations, as authorities treated both similarly in records. Prostitution, previously male-only, opened to women, with a stark divide between poor sex workers and wealthy clients. Jean Lorrain described this dynamic in the journalistic story La Maison Philibert.

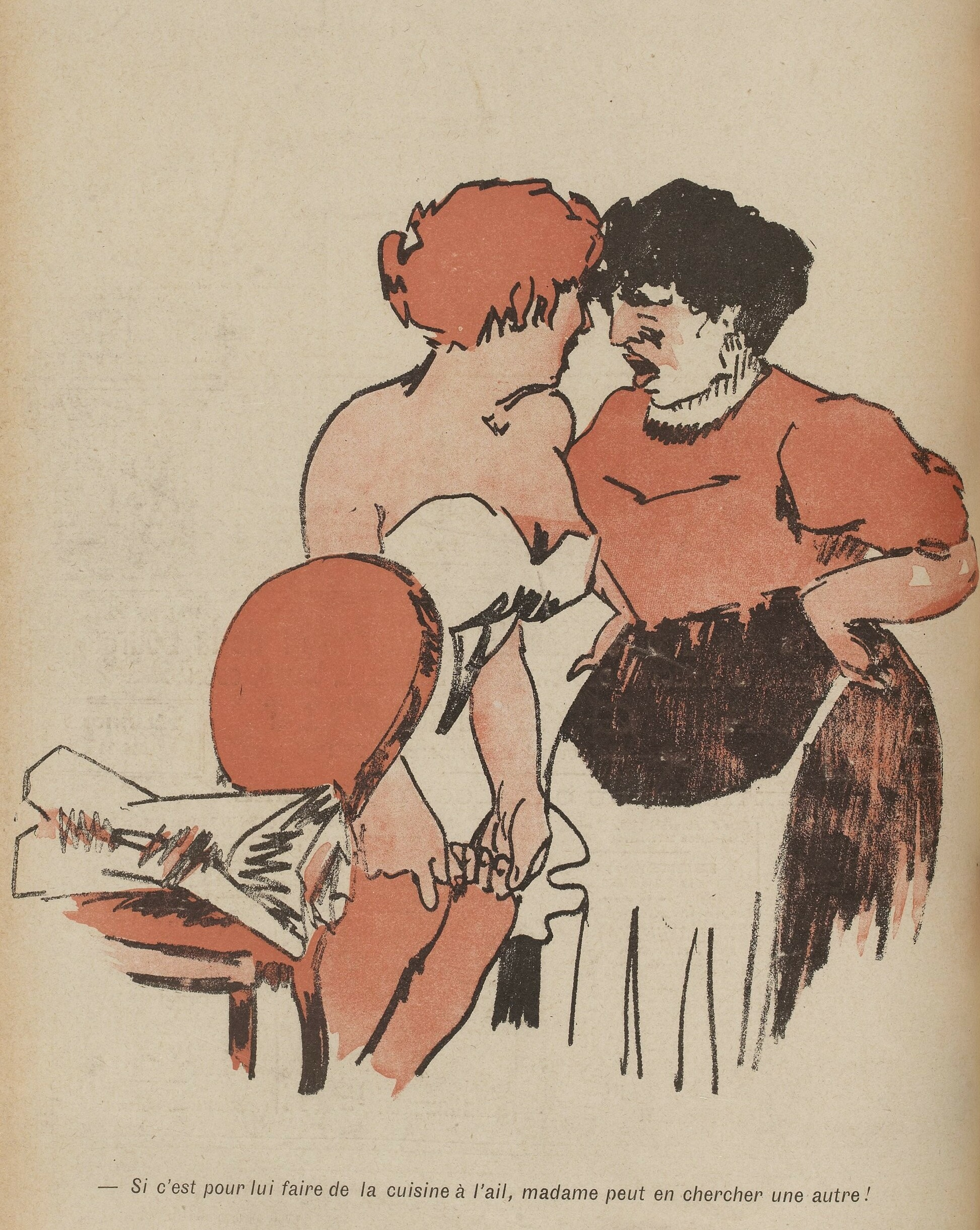
Caricature published in L'Assiette au beurre in 1912. The phrase "cooking with garlic" denotes lesbianism.

A lesbian culture developed with its own vocabulary: lesbians used terms like "gousse" (active partner or pimp), "chipée des femmes," "être pour femmes," and, among working-class women, "gougnotte", "vendeuse d'ail" ("eating garlic" meaning cunnilingus), and "vrille" (passive partner). The Parisian bar Le Hanneton was a hub for working-class lesbianism.

Despite the presence of gay and lesbian individuals across society, trade union culture associated homosexuality with the ruling classes and heterosexuality with popular struggles. In 1896, tobacco workers launched a movement to fire a despised foreman after his homosexuality was revealed.

In July 1905, young inmates at the Douaires penal colony near Gaillon (Normandy) rioted after authorities attempted to curb homosexual relations among inmates, possibly one of the earliest modern queer riots.

The first French homosexual magazine, Akademos, was launched in 1909 by Jacques d'Adelswärd-Fersen but ceased after 11 issues due to financial difficulties.

In the late 1900s, the Harden–Eulenburg affair in Germany, accusing Wilhelm II's entourage of homosexuality, was covered by French media, mocking the German army. French press also highlighted homosexuality in the French army, such as the 1907 "Belfort scandal," "Brest scandal," and "Bourges scandal," involving a captain and lieutenant of the 95th Infantry Regiment accused of relations with soldiers. Other cases followed in 1910 and 1912, involving a Frenchman and a German soldier with unproven espionage suspicions.

==== Evolution of representations ====
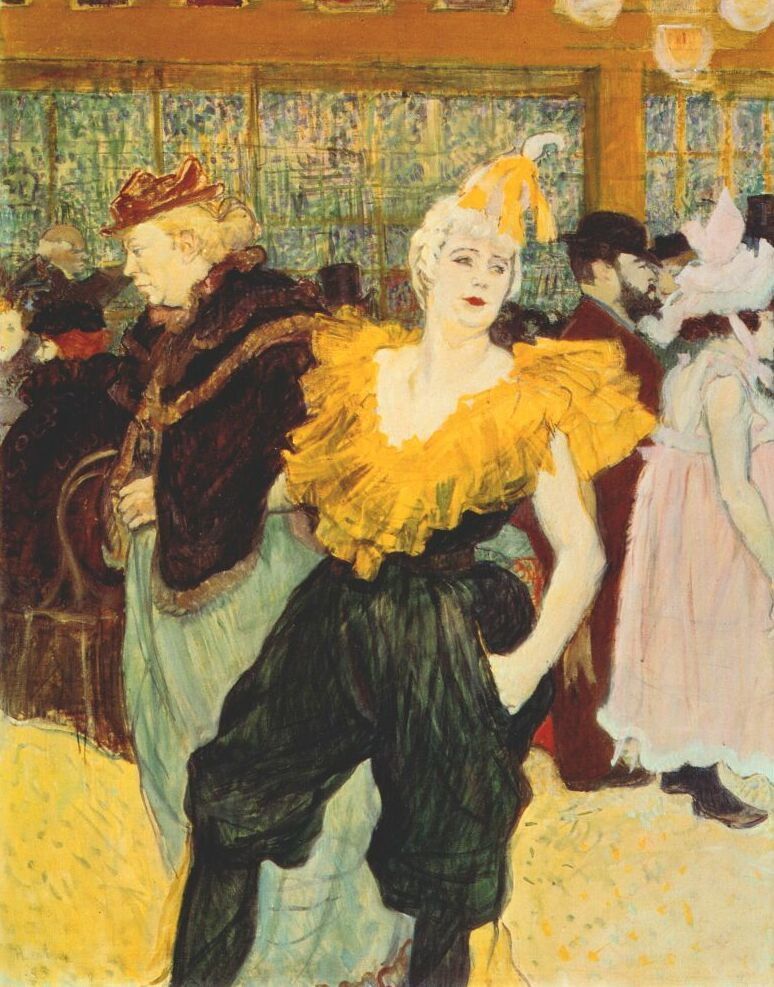
Henri de Toulouse-Lautrec, La clown Cha-U-Kao au moulin rouge, 1895.

New homophobic prejudices, influenced by Ambroise Tardieu's theses, portrayed homosexual men as inherently jealous and violent, used by the judiciary as evidence of guilt in murder cases.

Heterosexual culture adopted sexualizing and fetishizing terms for lesbians: "tribade" referred to women practicing tribadism, and "sapphic" denoted those engaging in oral sex with women. These terms did not apply to butch lesbians, who were identified by appearance, particularly clothing or hairstyles. This sexualization included erotic and pornographic images of women for male audiences, and by 1890, Parisian tourist guides listed the best places to view female same-sex encounters.

The upper classes viewed the "sexually innocent" working classes as incapable of homosexuality unless "corrupted". Lesbianism was strongly associated with prostitution, making it hard for contemporaries to imagine a lesbian who was not a prostitute.

In the late 19th century, Oscar Wilde became a role model for homosexual individuals in France, notably André Gide. The period saw numerous homoerotic photographs, both male and female.

Marcel Proust, a pioneer of the homosexual novel in France, was among the first to address the taboo of homosexuality in literature. Homosexual or transgender autobiographies, like that of Arthur Belorget, known as La Comtesse, appeared in medical treatises.

In the 1890s, works on female homosexuality, real or imagined, proliferated. Georges Barbier published the Songs of Bilitis, a collection of poems purportedly translated from Greek, while Henri de Toulouse-Lautrec painted openly lesbian clown Cha-U-Kao.

==== World War I ====
World War I, by separating many men from their homes, created a unique moment for the acceptance and expression of lesbian couples. However, military authorities actively discouraged relationships between soldiers. Since 1896, homosexuality was increasingly associated with Germany, particularly Berlin's male prostitution and gay life, dubbed "the German vice." France, identifying with Athens, contrasted Germany with ancient Sparta, seen as "barbaric, culturally and aesthetically inferior, militaristic, and plagued by homosexuality". During the war, homosexuality was framed as an enemy practice.

This view was paradoxical, as France did not legally penalize homosexuality, unlike the German Empire, which controlled Alsace-Lorraine from 1871 to the end of World War I and repressed unnatural sexual acts among men. Between 1902 and 1913, 144 charges and 114 convictions were recorded.

Natalist discourse, viewing births as essential to the French nation's survival, framed heterosexual desire as patriotic, as seen in André Gide's Corydon. Post-war fears of national decline, fueled by the loss of 1.3 million young men in the trenches, intensified this anxiety, erroneously predicting the French people's disappearance within thirty years.

=== 1920s and 1930s ===
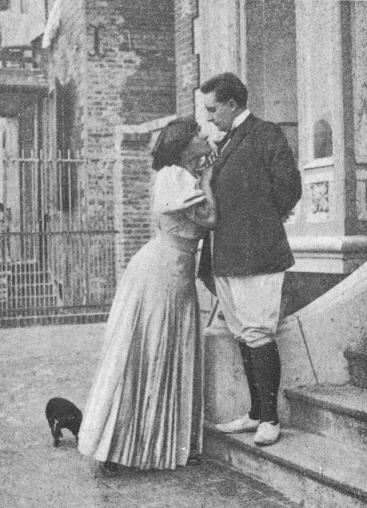
Colette with her partner Mathilde de Morny.

The Roaring Twenties saw significant visibility and freedom for homosexual lifestyles, especially in Paris, centered around bars and clubs in Montparnasse, Pigalle, and Montmartre, such as the lesbian bar Le Fétiche, Eva Kotchever's le Boudoir de l'Amour, and the male bar Magic City, as well as other meeting places like houses of passage, steam baths, and public urinals. A major event was the cross-dressing ball at mid-Lent hosted by Magic City. This sociability extended to sailors' prostitution in ports like Rouen and Toulon, and certain Parisian bars (Rue de Lappe). Some clients lived openly homosexual lives.

This period was vibrant for literature on homosexuality, including Xavier Boulestin's Fréquentations de Maurice (1911), depicting an androgynous dandy; Victor Margueritte's La « Garçonne » (1922), a harsh portrayal of lesbians; André Gide's Corydon (1924); Willy's Troisième Sexe (1927), a guide to Paris's gay and lesbian venues; Colette's Le Pur et l'Impur (1931), a nonjudgmental portrayal of lesbianism; and Roger Martin du Gard's Le Taciturne (1931), where the protagonist commits suicide upon realizing his homosexuality. The journal Marges dedicated a 1926 issue to the homosexual preoccupation. Openly lesbian writer Natalie Clifford Barney reintroduced the poet Sappho to the United States and Western world, including France.

This visibility did not prevent violent homophobic outbursts. The 1933 assassination of Oscar Dufrenne, known as the Palace crime, sparked homophobic rhetoric; two homosexual men were accused, one only in the press, the other acquitted at trial. The French Communist Party, founded in 1920, viewed homosexuality as a luxury unaffordable to the working class; right-wing parties used Louise Michel's lesbianism to discredit her, while anarchist movements portrayed her as a hardened celibate rather than defending her identity. Numerous homophobic medical, psychological, and political publications followed André Gide's Corydon.

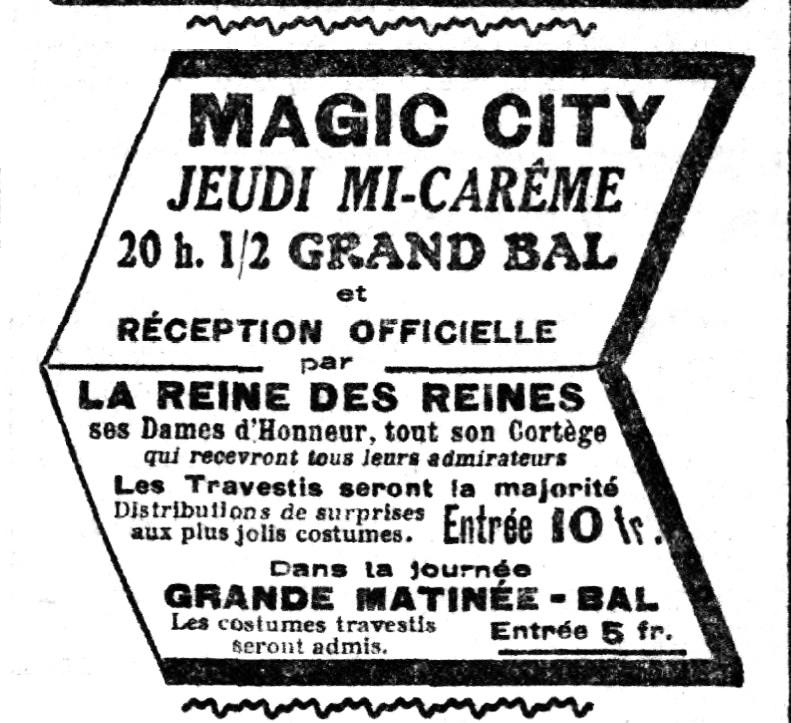
Advertisement for the 1920 mid-Lent ball at Magic City.

While the term "homosexual" was known since 1869, it was rarely used; preferred terms included uranian, invert, pederast, ephebe, depraved man for gay men, and damned woman for lesbians. This multiplicity reflected a lack of unity among LGBT individuals, who, despite frequenting meeting places, did not necessarily share a common culture or form a distinct political movement. Gide, for instance, distinguished "inverts" as effeminate, weak, homophobic stereotypes from "pederasts" as respectable, physically robust, and masculine homosexuals.

The journal Inversions, publishing four issues in 1924 and one in 1925, was the closest to a French LGBT community anchor, focusing on homosexual history, culture, and combating stereotypes. However, it faced internal criticism (underrepresentation of lesbians, unclear mission, overly explicit title) and state repression, accused of outraging public morals and promoting contraception. Its creators, Gustave Beyria and Gaston Lestrade, were fined 200 francs and sentenced to six months in prison.

The first series of gender-affirming surgeries occurred in Germany at the Hirschfeld Institute in the 1920s, benefiting Dorchen Richter. Surgeon Felix Abraham, partly trained in France, performed and documented these procedures. Trans individuals like Richter, Danish painter Lili Elbe, and Frenchman Henri Accès received enthusiastic press coverage in 1930s France. Literature embraced transidentity with novels like Maurice Rostand's La Femme qui était en lui, Marcel Sherol's L'expérience du docteur Laboulette, and Pierre de la Batut's story Le Plaisir singulier.

In 1929, Violette Morris underwent a mastectomy. Her masculine attire led the French Women's Sports Federation to deny her a sports license, inviting her to compete with men, though her writings suggest she identified as a woman. Medical opinion, led by psychiatrist Agnès Masson, was critical, viewing gender-affirming surgeries and cross-dressing permits as a response to Germany's criminalization of homosexuality. Masson argued that German homophobia drove Hirschfeld to distinguish homosexuality from transidentity to normalize the latter. Influenced by psychoanalytic theories, French medical and psychiatric consensus leaned toward the pathologization of transidentity.

== World War II ==
=== Alsace-Lorraine ===
Alsace-Lorraine was de facto annexed by the Third Reich in June 1940. The French Penal Code ceased to apply in 1942, gradually replaced by the German Penal Code in 1941. Residents held a unique status as ethnic Germans (Volksdeutsche) but not citizens (Reichsdeutsche). Intense police and administrative repression began in summer 1940, using extrajudicial measures to bypass legal constraints and harshly target homosexuality. A registry of homosexual men was compiled in November 1940 in the Bas-Rhin and in July 1942 in Moselle. While French police did not maintain such registries, they contributed through active participation or by providing records of indecency convictions.

Convictions relied on denunciations, encouraged by the regime, from mayors, colleagues, neighbors, or family. Hundreds of Alsace-Lorraine residents were expelled to unoccupied France as part of the Nazi purification (Reinigung) of annexed territories. Those deemed incurable due to persistent practices or personality were targeted, while others faced reeducation camps or forced labor. Repressive rhetoric distinguished between acquired (less severe) and innate homosexuality, the latter associated with effeminate traits and the potential to corrupt youth.

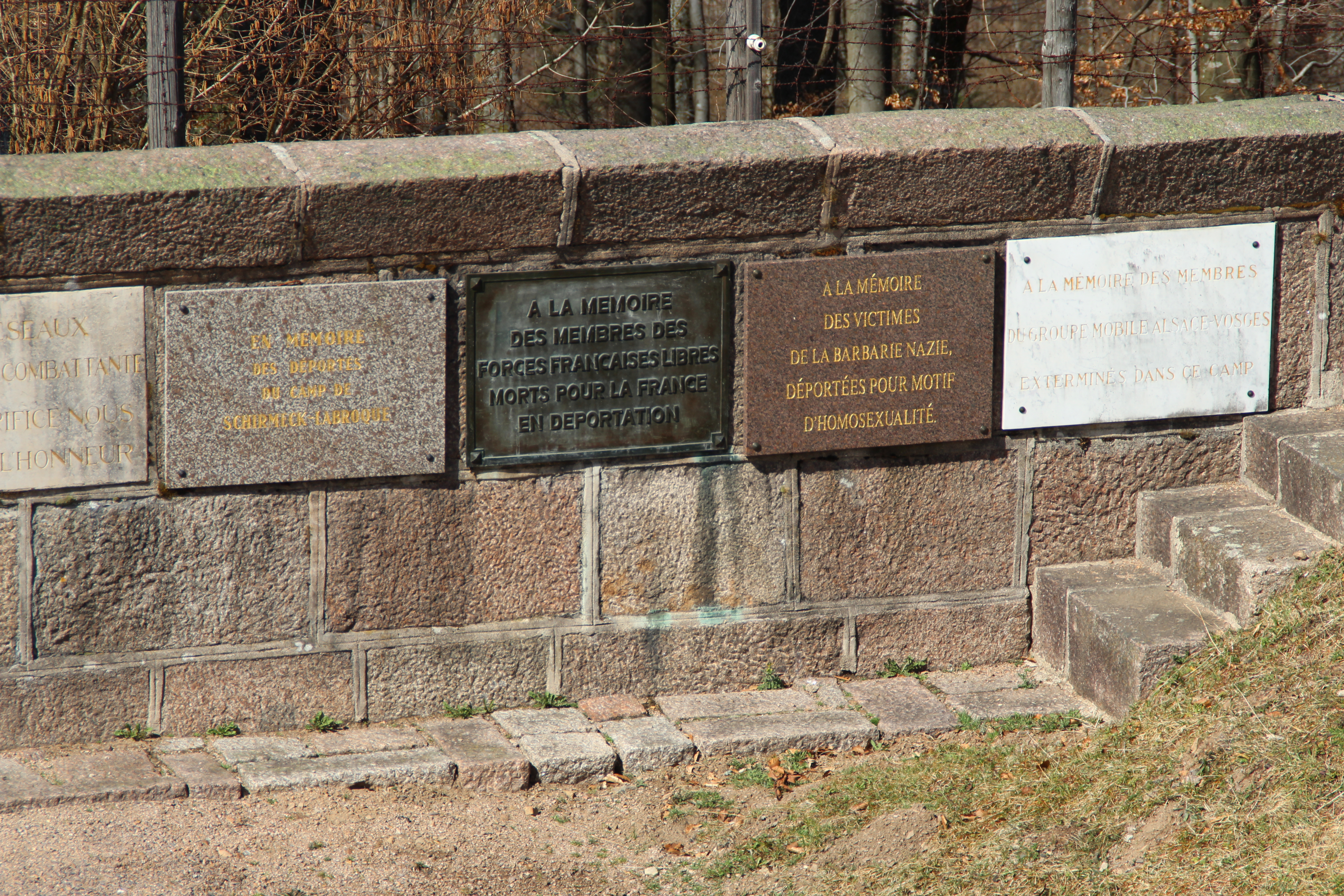
Plaques commemorating deportees at Natzweiler-Struthof camp, one specifically for those deported for homosexuality.

Repression affected all ages, from a 14-year-old to a 74-year-old, particularly targeting the working classes due to their more visible social practices. Unlike in Baden, Alsace-Lorraine's condemned expressed little homosexual or bisexual identity, possibly due to less exposure to German homosexual theoretical literature of the 1930s.

After 1942, expulsions gave way to internments, primarily at the Schirmeck-Vorbruck security camp. Internees were marked with a light blue square, like asocials, priests, or prostitutes. Some died in the camp, others were expelled to France, and some were transferred to concentration camps like Natzweiler-Struthof, Buchenwald, or Dachau. These variations stemmed from internal Nazi disagreements, with Heinrich Himmler favoring mass deportations to concentration camps, opposed by Robert Wagner. Consequently, Moselle's homosexuals were often expelled to France, while Alsatians were sent to concentration camps. This repression affected hundreds of men.

While some homosexuals fled repression in France or joined the French Resistance, most remained, adopting precautions like favoring anonymous relationships or preparing mutual defenses before meetings.

=== During and after World War II ===
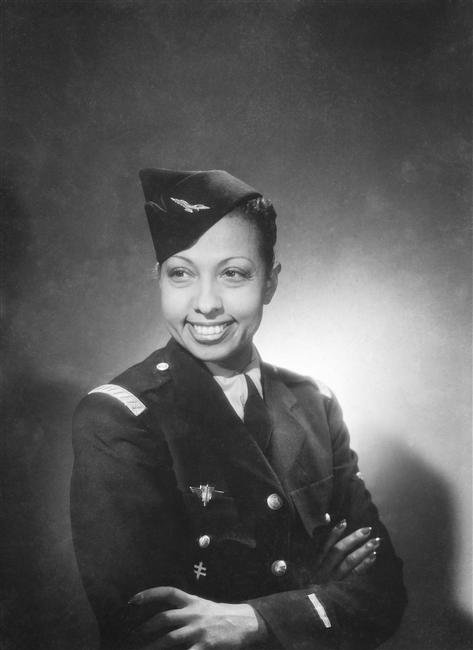
Joséphine Baker, bisexual and member of the French Resistance, posing in 1948 for Studio Harcourt in her air force uniform.

Homosexual and bisexual individuals were present across all segments of French society during the Occupation, with some aligning with collaborationist factions (Abel Bonnard, Marcel Bucard, Robert Brasillach, Violette Morris) and others joining the Resistance (Pascal Copeau, Édith Thomas, Jean Moulin, Daniel Cordier, Roger Stéphane, Joséphine Baker, Pierre Herbart, Marie-Thérèse Auffray, Ovida Delect, Thérèse Pierre, Andrée Jacob, Éveline Garnier, Rose Valland, Jean Desbordes, Claude Cahun, Marcel Moore).

Homosexual practices, though poorly documented, were not uncommon in the French military or among French prisoners of war in Germany. Numerous homosexual relationships were openly conducted in the Foreign Legion.

In Paris, homosexual life was not significantly disrupted by the Occupation. Henry de Montherlant noted that it was even easier to "pick up" young men than before the war. Homosexual meeting places such as Liberty's, Le Select, Chez Narcisse, Le Bœuf sur le Toit, or simpler venues like the groves of the Champ de Mars, the Strasbourg-Saint-Denis metro station, the Bois de Vincennes, or public urinals remained heavily frequented, now also by German officers and prostitutes alongside regular patrons.

Despite prohibitions by German authorities, many German soldiers engaged in sexual relationships with French civilians. While some, like Daniel Guérin, morally condemned these relationships and abstained, others, including far-right figures like Jacques de Ricaumont or Jewish resisters like Robert Francès, engaged with German soldiers. Such relationships also occurred outside Paris and were depicted in post-war semi-autobiographical novels such as Pompes funèbres by Jean Genet, Le monde inversé by André du Dognon, and Les amours dissidentes by Boris Arnold. Fearing that a total ban would lead to increased rapes, the German occupiers requisitioned brothels, including about forty in Paris, for exclusive use by the Wehrmacht, while monitoring homosexual prostitution venues and punishing German soldiers who frequented them.

The French defeat was often interpreted as a failure of masculinity, seen as evidence of the decadent and feminized Third Republic. In this context, the Vichy regime condemned both male and female homosexuality as unnatural, reversing the 1791 penal code's decriminalization of "sodomy" in 1942. This initiative stemmed solely from the French government, not the German occupiers, who viewed homosexuality among the occupied as a beneficial weakness rather than a priority to combat. The decision aligned with Vichy's natalist and family-centric policies and responded to pressures from jurists, military officials, and police seeking tools to prosecute homosexuals accused of "corrupting youth", a cause nearly successful in 1939. This law criminalized homosexual relations, both male and female, involving minors under 21. However, it was rarely enforced during the war; the police, particularly in Paris, preferred using public indecency laws to prosecute homosexuals. French police passed these convictions to the German police, who dismissed them without action.

Deportation was limited but real in France outside Alsace-Moselle, affecting at least 38 French individuals, with 23 deported to Germany, 12 to prisons, and 11 to concentration camps as Politischer Franzose, where six died. The most famous deportee was Pierre Seel, who published a testimony of his experience in 1994. These arrests targeted only those who had relations with or attempted to seduce German soldiers.

During the Liberation of France, thousands of women who had relationships with German soldiers were publicly shaved; while rumors suggest similar treatment for men, no evidence exists. The period saw a surge in male homosexuality, with Le Bœuf sur le Toit in Paris becoming a gathering place for gay men from around the world, including Americans, Poles, Scots, Algerians, French, and Russians. However, the virilist policies of the Resistance, liberated France, and Gaullism ended this brief period, reaffirming the penalization of homosexuality established by Vichy on February 8, 1945.

=== 1945 to 1965 ===
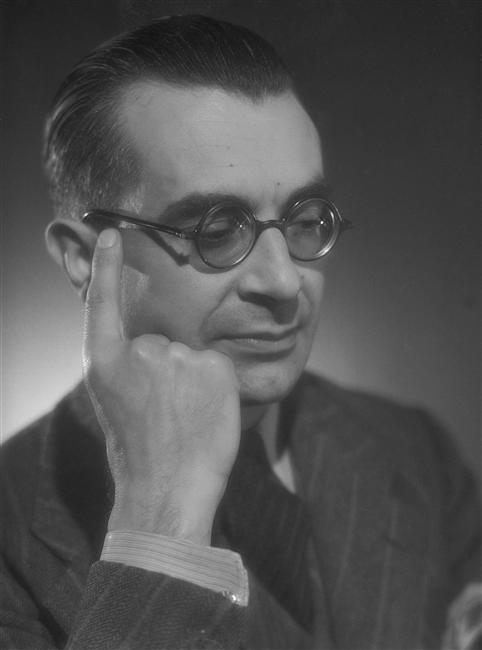
Roger Peyrefitte in 1947, Studio Harcourt.

==== Increased repression ====
During this period, the term "homophilia" was often used, sometimes interchangeably with homosexuality and sometimes distinguished from it.

The post-war period was marked by intensified state repression of homosexuality, with several hundred convictions annually in the 1950s under the law prohibiting homosexual relations with minors under 21. In 1950, socialist deputy Georges Archidice was arrested for sexual relations with Abbé Fernand Charpin in the toilets of Marseille Saint-Charles station; though quickly released, the public scandal forced his resignation from the party. In 1960, homosexuality was declared a "national scourge", equated with alcoholism and prostitution, and the offense of public indecency was aggravated when involving homosexual relations. Meanwhile, trans women and cross-dressers faced ongoing police harassment.

The two dominant political parties of the era, the Christian-democrat MRP and the French Communist Party, viewed heterosexuality as the sole norm, especially as the country aimed to boost its birth rate.

Repression extended to culture: homosexuality was nearly absent from artistic representations, and censorship, enforced through her publisher Gallimard, forced Violette Leduc to rewrite parts of Ravages.

==== Persistent cultural life ====
Despite these challenges, LGBT life persisted through venues like Carroll's, run by Frede, which served as pickup and meeting spots, and publications such as Futur, Gioventù, or Juventus. Non-LGBT-targeted media, like bodybuilding magazines, were also repurposed by the community. The heart of LGBT, particularly gay, life during this period was Arcadie, founded by André Baudry, both as a magazine and a discreet Parisian club that avoided drawing attention. In 1955, Daniel Guérin published Kinsey et la sexualité, detailing the specific oppression faced by homosexuals in France. For women, Françoise Mallet-Joris wrote Rempart des béguines in 1951, Nicole Louvier Qui qu'en grogne in 1953, and Irène Monesi Althia in 1957.

In 1964, the filming of Les Amitiés particulières, adapted from the novel by Roger Peyrefitte, faced sharp criticism, prompting Peyrefitte to publish Lettre ouverte à Monsieur François Mauriac, membre de l'Académie française, prix Nobel, arguing that François Mauriac's homophobia stemmed from repressed homosexuality, particularly his relationship with Jean Cocteau.

While cabarets like Carroll's offered lesbian sadomasochistic performances, these were not intended for lesbian or bisexual women, who avoided them. At the time, there was no distinct lesbian scene, as homosexual bars were predominantly male; lesbian identity was often discovered in solitude, with small circles forming gradually.

==== Emergence of the trans community ====
The trans community began to gain visibility and structure. In 1954, painter Michel-Marie Poulain published her autobiography J'ai choisi mon sexe, significantly raising public awareness of trans identity In 1959, photographer Christer Strömholm documented the trans community at Place Blanche, highlighting their strong solidarity and the police harassment they faced. Marie-Andrée Schwindenhammer, a trans woman, connected trans women working at the Parisian transgender cabaret Le Carrousel with her roommate, Madame Bonnet, an expert in permanent electrolysis hair removal. Tensions arose: Schwindenhammer criticized Poulain for presenting a negative image of trans identity by allowing her daughter to call her "papa" in public and maintaining a lesbian relationship with her pre-transition spouse.

During this period, artist Coccinelle revolutionized the trans/travesti cabaret genre, focusing not on the comedic effect of unconvincing cross-dressing but on the fascination of a successful male-to-female transformation. Her fame grew internationally after media coverage of her vaginoplasty, inspiring many trans women to pursue the same procedure. This prompted a reaction from the Ordre des médecins, which argued that only medical authorities, particularly endocrinologists and neuropsychiatrists, could authorize gender-affirming surgeries, limiting them to intersex individuals. Trans women who did not, or could not access vaginoplasties, such as Fétiche, could not legally change their gender marker until 1992, when the Court of Cassation urged by President Mitterrand conditionally authorized the modification of the sex designation on civil status documents. Coccinelle married in a church in 1962 after obtaining a legal gender change, but the resulting scandal led French authorities to ban such changes for trans women until the late 1970s. The golden age of transgender cabaret, along with Coccinelle's fame and nude photos, linked trans women in the French public's mind with spectacle and eroticism, despite trans identity already being present across various societal layers.

==== Colonial history ====
From the onset of French conquest, Algeria was subject to an orientalizing gaze, with stereotypes of hypersexual Arab men. This stereotype dated back to the 18th century, when Muslim men were seen as bisexual. To counter the risk of homosexual relationships among French settlers or with Algerians, General Tlemben established a large sex market supplied by French women sent to the colony for prostitution. In the 1950s and 1960s, Casablanca became the ideal location for French trans women to undergo gender-affirming surgery, due to prohibitions on such procedures in Metropolitan France.

=== 1965 to 1981 ===
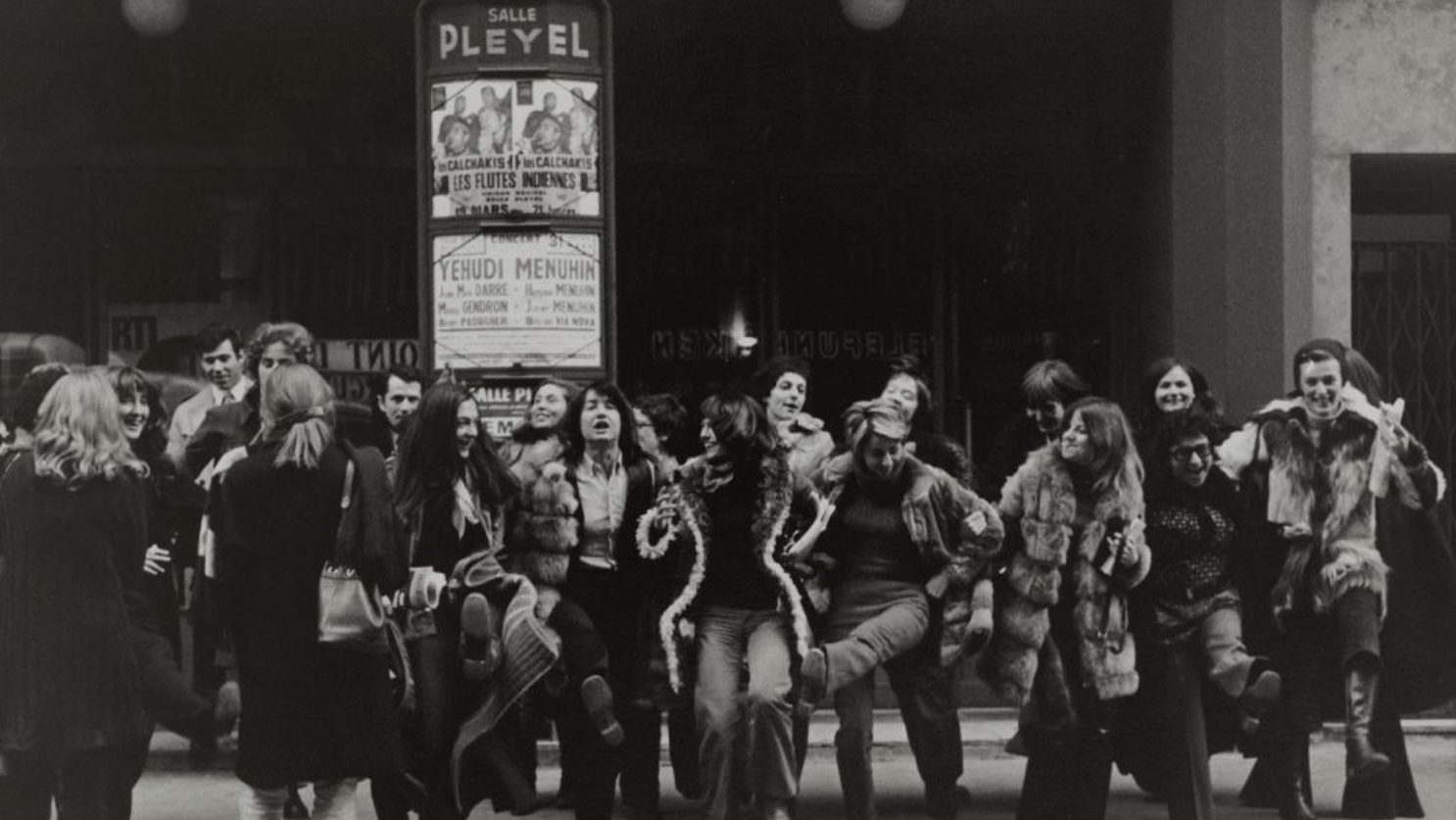
On March 10, 1971, at 2:35 p.m., following the disruption of the RTL program "Homosexuality, This Painful Problem" hosted by Ménie Grégoire at Salle Pleyel, lesbian activists took a photo.

In 1965, Marie-Andrée Schwindenhammer founded the Association des malades hormonaux (AMAHO), France's first transgender association. By 1981, the association had 1,500 members, many of whom were sex workers, offering transition support such as permanent hair removal, hormone therapy, mentoring, and social activities.

In May 1968, the Comité d'action pédérastique révolutionnaire was formed at the Sorbonne, a student organization advocating for the sexual freedom of "erotic minorities": homosexuals, voyeurs, masochists, and swingers.

The defining moment for the homosexual movement occurred on March 10, 1971, when Ménie Grégoire hosted her live RTL show Allo Ménie, themed "Homosexuality, This Painful Problem." The broadcast was disrupted by lesbian and feminist activists who deemed it homophobic, featuring "moral authorities" like a priest and a psychoanalyst. This event led to the formation of the Homosexual Front for Revolutionary Action (FHAR). The protesters, a group from the Women's Liberation Movement including Maffra, Christine Delphy, Monique Wittig, Elisabeth Salvaresi, Antoinette Fouque, and Anne de Bascher, formed the FHAR that evening. Joined by men, the founding women became a minority in their own group. They then established the Gouines rouges and theorized political lesbianism. In 1975, Les Mirabelles, a transvestite theater group, was founded to support FHAR actions.

In 1972, David et Jonathan, one of France's oldest LGBT associations, was founded within the Christian movement. On January 21, 1975, Les Dossiers de l'écran hosted the first French television debate on homosexuality, featuring openly gay writers (Roger Peyrefitte, Yves Navarre, Jean-Louis Bory), two doctors, a priest, and deputy Paul Mirguet, who authored the Mirguet Amendment labeling homosexuality a "scourge". Researcher Mathias Quéré noted, "This was the first time homosexuality was shown at prime time with a respectable face." The broadcast reached 19 million viewers.

In 1979, Jean Le Bitoux founded the magazine Gai Pied, which grew from a monthly to a weekly publication, reaching 50,000 copies sold. That same year, the Paris Les Halles homosexual committee organized a large July 14 ball near Square Jean-XXIII, attended by 2,000 people. In 1980, Yves Navarre won the Prix Goncourt for Le Jardin d'acclimatation, a novel about a young homosexual man undergoing a lobotomy to conform to his parents' expectations of a heterosexual family life.

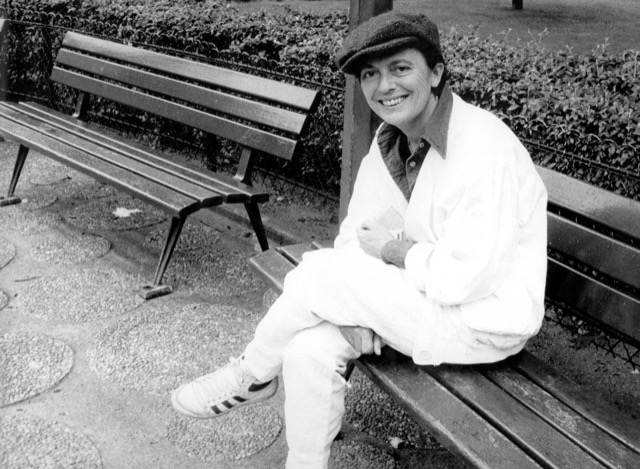
Monique Wittig, theorist of materialist feminism, lesbian feminism, and radical lesbianism.

This period was one of political vibrancy, influenced by the Gay Liberation Front, with translations and dissemination by François Lasquin. The FHAR collaborated with the feminist movement and revolutionary left through protests and happenings. Monique Wittig, with La Pensée straight, founded radical lesbianism and revolutionized thinking about lesbianism and heterosexuality. Building on Simone de Beauvoir's idea that the category of "woman" is socially constructed, Wittig argued that heterosexuality is a political regime enforcing male domination over women, with lesbianism as the only space of freedom for women until sex-based social classes are abolished.

However, this era was also marked by divisions: between lesbians and gay men, heterosexual and lesbian feminists (with tensions over The Straight Mind), the heterosexual revolutionary left and the homosexual movement, far-left and right-wing homosexual groups, and trans women and gay men, particularly cross-dressers. Public criticism emerged of racism within the homosexual community toward Maghrebi men, accused of perpetuating orientalist stereotypes and exploiting the image of the "Arab man" without addressing their real concerns.

The late 1970s saw a shift in homosexual visibility: increased political and media presence, with openly homosexual candidacies like Différence homosexuelle in the 1978 legislative elections and the creation of magazines (Gai Pied, G Magazine) and the UEH de Marseille, but a decline in public space visibility due to the gradual replacement of public urinals, making gay cruising more difficult.

During this period, the terms "pédés" and "homosexuels" coexisted, though the American term "gay" gained popularity. This visibility was met with violent repression. During the 1978 Homosexual Film Festival, about twenty far-right militants disrupted the screening of Le Droit du plus fort, injuring spectators, vandalizing the venue, and stealing the cash register.

=== 1981 to 1996: The AIDS years ===
==== "Decriminalization of homosexuality" ====
While homosexuality was not strictly illegal in France since the French Revolution, numerous provisions in 1981 hindered its practice, including police filing of homosexuals, differing ages of consent (15 for heterosexual relations, 18 for homosexual ones), implicitly homophobic requirements for civil service ("good morals") or tenancy ("good family man"), and bans on displaying gay and lesbian press. The repeal of these measures was termed the "decriminalization of homosexuality" by lesbian and gay activists of the 1970s and early 1980s, a campaign promise of socialist presidential candidate François Mitterrand in the 1981 election.

After his election, the age of consent was equalized at 15, police filing was abolished (Defferre and Badinter circulars), the Quillot law reformed tenancy conditions, and civil service reforms opened positions to homosexuals. The decade began with a sense of liberation for LGBT people. Both the discreet activism of Arcadie in the 1960s and the bold actions of the FHAR in the 1970s seemed outdated. Le Monde noted: "No more lowered eyes, no more anger, their heirs are celebrating". In 1983, Homosexualités et socialisme was created.

=== The AIDS epidemic ===
==== The "gay cancer" and denial ====
The first mention of AIDS in France, not yet identified as such, appeared in September 1981 in Gai Pied, reporting a disease in New York affecting "only fags". That summer, Willy Rozenbaum treated a homosexual patient with multiple infectious diseases, forming a medical team with immunologist Jacques Leibowitch, who first hypothesized a retrovirus cause. By late 1982, they contacted Luc Montagnier, Jean-Claude Chermann, and Françoise Barré-Sinoussi at the Pasteur Institute to validate this hypothesis. The HIV virus was identified in May 1983 and recognized as the cause of AIDS in 1984. Meanwhile, the number of identified cases rose from 11 in 1981 to 377 in 1984.

Medical advances did not translate to social awareness. A media campaign fearing anti-gay attacks and a return to moral conservatism led to denial among gay activists. Some even propagated a conspiracy theory that AIDS was a homophobic invention by Ronald Reagan. Those acknowledging the disease downplayed its severity, refusing to reduce sexual partners. The magazine Masques stated in late 1984, "Better to die of AIDS than of boredom". Financial interests also played a role: owners of newly established gay saunas and backrooms feared prevention messages would deter clients. Serophobia emerged, with infected individuals socially isolated, their belongings destroyed post-death due to irrational contamination fears.

==== AIDES: The community response ====
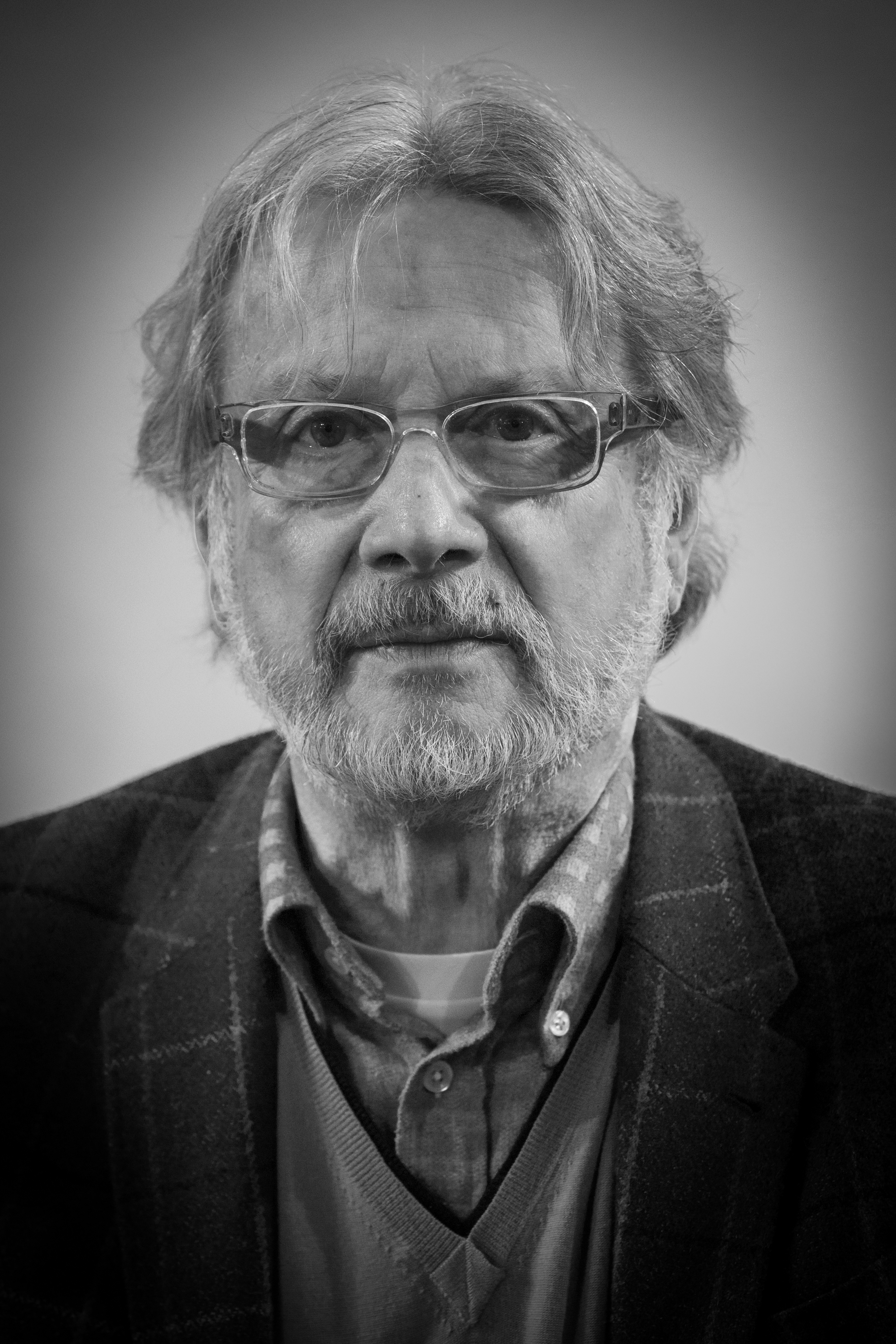
Daniel Defert, founder of AIDES, an AIDS advocacy group, established after the death of his partner Michel Foucault.

The community response centered on associations. The earliest, Vaincre le sida (VSL), was founded in August 1983 during the Euro-Mediterranean Summer Universities of Homosexualities by doctor Patrice Meyer, offering patient support, informational brochures, and hotlines. AIDES, created in November 1984 by Daniel Defert after the death of his partner, philosopher Michel Foucault, distinguished volunteers, AIDS patients, and homosexuals as separate groups in its communication. AIDES distributed brochures in bars, provided condoms, advertised prevention in Gai Pied, established a telephone hotline, and created a "buddies" support system. AIDES gradually overcame resistance from bar and sauna owners who, from 1985 to 1987, opposed prevention messages but failed to halt the disease's spread: volunteers grew from 37 to 3,600 between 1984 and 1994, but cases rose from 377 to over 37,000.

Arcat-Sida was founded in 1985, the same year as Act Up-Paris, established by Didier Lestrade, Pascal Loubet, and Luc Coulavin, modeled on Act Up New York.

==== Act Up: Politicization ====
Beyond patient support and therapy access, these associations advanced testing availability from 1985 and prevention methods, including condom advertisements and over-the-counter syringe sales from 1987.

In 1992, the autobiographical film Les Nuits fauves by bisexual director Cyril Collard won the César Award for Best Film three days after his death from AIDS, significantly raising awareness, particularly among young audiences.

==== Fighting lesbian invisibility ====
French lesbian history is marked by the marginalization of lesbians in LGBT spaces, organizations, and media, whether founded by women or not. The Homosexual Front for Revolutionary Action, initially created by lesbians, became increasingly male-dominated as it became a sexual meeting place, with lesbians sidelined symbolically and ignored in meetings.

The late 1970s and early 1980s saw a surge in lesbian and homosexual visibility with publications like Masques, Homophonies, When Women Love, Madivine, Clit 007 (published in Geneva), New Feminist Questions, Amazons of Yesterday, Lesbians of Today, and Interlopes. These covered politics, culture, literature, and personal ads. The Archives Recherches et Cultures Lesbiennes (ARCL) was founded in 1983 to consolidate the scattered lesbian memory. Michèle Larrouy was a key figure.

From 1990 to 1999, twenty lesbian associations formed and networked, federating in 1996 as the Coordination Lesbienne Nationale, later the Coordination Lesbienne en France (CLF). It aimed to promote lesbian visibility, legitimize lesbian rights, advocate for asylum for persecuted lesbians, and build networks, coordinating militant and cultural groups like Les lesbiennes font leur cinéma and the Toulouse Lesbian Spring.

== 20th century ==
=== 1900–1960 ===
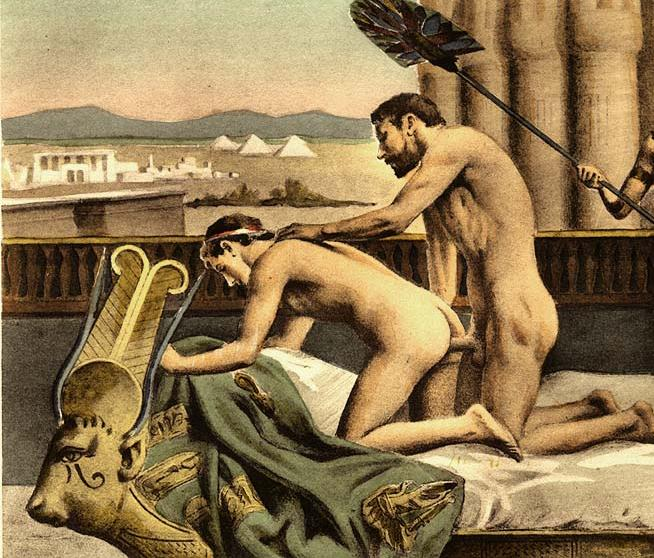
Plate VII: Hadrian and Antinous by Édouard-Henri Avril, De Figuris Veneris, circa 1906

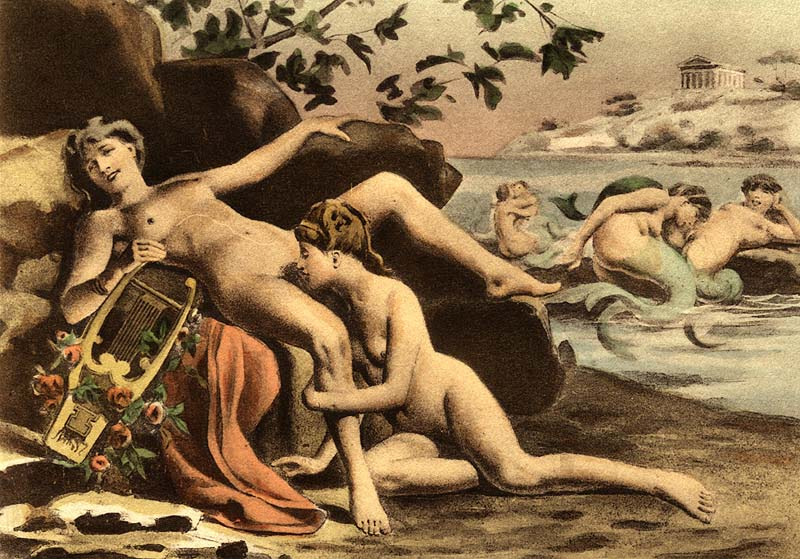
Plate XIII: Sappho with Mermaids by Édouard-Henri Avril, De Figuris Veneris, 1906

In 1905, the youth detained at Les Douaires (a youth detention site in France) rioted following attempts of the penal administration to ban homosexual relationships between youths. This may be one of the earliest queer riots recorded.In 1906, Édouard-Henri "Paul" Avril published the pornographic book, De Figuris Veneris, complete with plate prints of sex acts throughout ancient history. In 1907, Avril provided erotic illustration including a lesbian image, for a republication of the novel, Fanny Hill. In the same year, Georges Méliès' The Eclipse, or the Courtship of the Sun and Moon (L'éclipse du soleil en pleine lune) featured a potentially humorous scene with the personification of the sun and the moon in gay sexual practices, possibly analingus. In 1924, Inversions, the first French magazine for homosexuals, is founded. Due to strong prosecution, it had to stop its publication in early 1925 after only four issues.

L'éclipse du soleil en pleine lune, directed by Méliès, 1907

During World War II, Ovida Delect, a transgender woman, poet, and communist activist, was deported to a German concentration camp for her work with the French Resistance. In June 2019, Paris named a square after her. On 6 August 1942, the Vichy government introduced a discriminative law in penal code: article 334 (moved to article 331 on 8 February 1945 by the Provisional Government of the French Republic) increased the age of consent to 21 for homosexual relations and 15 for heterosexual ones.

In 1954, Arcadie Club, the first homosexual group in France, is formed by André Baudry. In the same year, transgender painter Michel Marie Poulain publishes her autobiography J'ai choisi mon sexe (I chose my sex), contributing to the general public knowledge and visibility of transgender identity. In 1960, Article 330, 2nd alinea, a clause that doubled the penalty for indecent exposure for homosexual activity, was inserted into the penal code.

=== 1960–1990 ===
In 1971, the first attempt at forming a gay male parade contingency took place during the traditional trade union march May Day, despite objections from the Central Confederation of Labour to what the organization described as a "tradition alien to the working class". The same year, the leftist-oriented Front homosexuel d'action révolutionnaire was organized, initiating a number of upstagings of various institutions in order to draw attention to the legal plight of homosexuals in French society and combat heterosexism. In 1974, after being denied access to the Museum of Fine Arts (the traditional meeting place), the FHAR gradually ceased to exist. They were succeeded by a number of groups known as the Groupe de libération homosexuelle, which organized film viewings and journal publications. In 1979, the Euro-Mediterranean Summer Universities for Homosexuals are established, leading to the establishment in the same year of CUARH. In 1981, On April 4, CUARH organized the largest demonstration for the reform of the age of consent in Paris, resulting in a promise by president François Mitterrand to do so the following year. In that year, France equalizes the age of consent; CUARH leads the first pride parade in French history in Paris. In 1983, Composer Claude Vivier is attacked and later murdered in Paris as the result of a homophobic hate crime, becoming a cause célèbre across Europe. In 1985, France prohibits discrimination based on lifestyle (mœurs) in employment and services.

=== From 1996: Toward equal rights ===
==== The fight for PACS ====
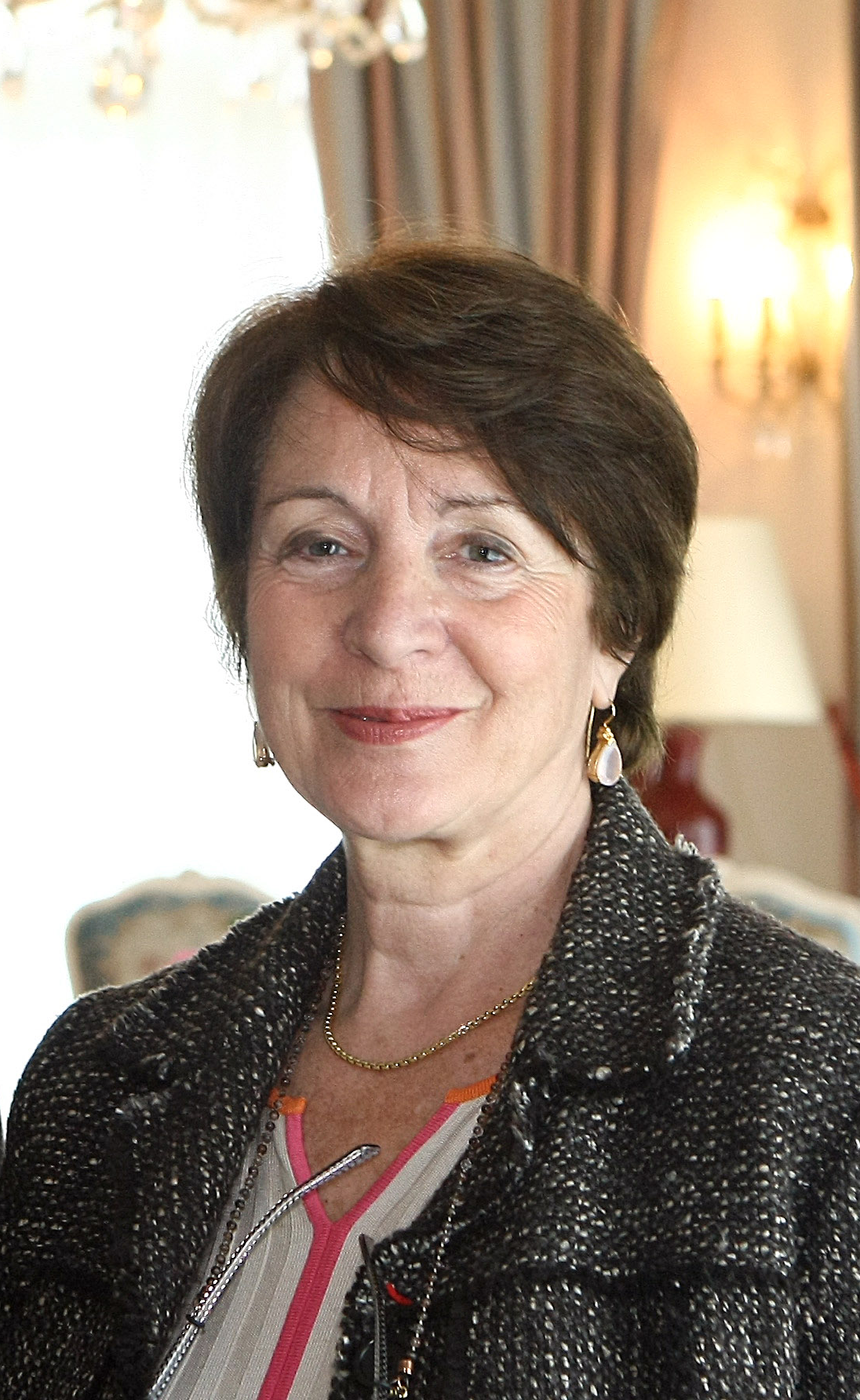
Catherine Tasca, politician who, as deputy and president of the Law Commission, worked to place and enact the PACS.

Homosexual couples were not recognized as legitimate partners: the Court of Cassation ruled in 1989 and 1997 that the inability to marry excluded them from concubinage rights. This was particularly dire during the AIDS epidemic, with partners unable to access mutual insurance, hospital visitation rights, lease transfers, or participate in mourning ceremonies.

Gay activists like Jan-Paul Pouliquen and left-wing deputies (Jean-Pierre Michel, Jean-Yves Autexier), alongside gay and feminist associations, developed a form of concubinage recognition open to both homosexual and heterosexual couples, gaining media traction during the 1997 elections. Despite initial hesitation from the Jospin government and strong opposition fueling public homophobia, the Civil Solidarity Pact (PACS) was enacted in 1999.

==== Combating biphobia ====
Bisexual visibility became a key issue. In 1995, four women, including Catherine Deschamps, from Act Up-Paris or lesbian associations, met at the Paris Gay and Lesbian Center to draft an article on bisexuality for Le 3 Keller. They formed a mixed group at the center, founding Bi'Cause in 1997, France's first association defending bisexual and pansexual rights.

In 2007, a Bisexual Awareness Day was established on September 23. In 2013, SOS Homophobie included a section on biphobia in its annual report for the first time.

== 21st century ==
=== 2000s ===
On 31 December 2004, the National Assembly approved an amendment to existing anti-discrimination legislation, making homophobic, sexist, racist, xenophobic etc. comments illegal. The law of December 2004 created the Haute autorité de lutte contre les discriminations et pour l'égalité (High Authority against Discrimination and for Equality) and amended the Law on the Freedom of the Press of 29 July 1881. In 2005, civil partners in PACs were allowed to file joint tax returns after entering into PACs rather than wait for three years. In March 2008, Xavier Darcos, Minister of Education, announced a policy fighting against all forms of discrimination, including homophobia, in schools. In April 2009, the French National Assembly voted to approve the extension of PACS to two French overseas collectivities: New Caledonia and Wallis and Futuna.

=== 2010s ===
In 2010, France removed gender identity disorder as a diagnosis by decree. On 6 November 2015, a bill to allow transgender people to legally change their gender without the need for sex reassignment surgery and forced sterilisation was approved by the French Senate. It was signed by the President on 18 November 2016, published in the Journal Officiel the next day, and took effect on 1 January 2017. In 2011, a bill to legalize same-sex marriage in France was defeated in conservative (UMP) majority National Assembly. In 2013, despite protests by anti-gay marriage groups, the law to legalize same-sex marriage was voted by the National Assembly and Senate which had a Socialist majority under François Hollande. The bill passed 331–225 in the National Assembly and 171–165 in the Senate. President Hollande promulgated the bill, which was officially published on 18 May 2013.

=== 2020s ===
In 2020, the engineer Marie Cau was elected (in March) and inaugurated (in May, after a delay due to the COVID-19 pandemic) as mayor of Tilloy-lez-Marchiennes, making her the first openly transgender mayor in France. On 16 March 2022, France removed the four-month deferral period policy on gay and bi men donating blood. The new policy applies to all individuals regardless of sexual orientation. On 9 January 2024, Gabriel Attal became France's first openly gay Prime Minister.

==== Effects of the COVID-19 pandemic ====
During the COVID-19 pandemic, sanitary restrictions caused income drops for LGBT individuals, particularly trans people. While civil society, notably the STRASS, organized food distributions, institutional support was lacking; requests to the Ministry of Equality went unanswered.

== Historiography ==
=== Research ===
LGBT history research in France is less active compared to the United Kingdom and United States. Historian Jeffrey Merrick attributes this to a widespread unified French culture, which downplays divisions like sexual orientation: "André Gide and Marguerite Yourcenar are seen as French figures who happened to have same-sex relationships, not as homosexual writers".

While developing, the field is marked by two traits: the invisibility of lesbian history, more recognized by French and European feminist and lesbian associations than academia, and a focus on literary history over other perspectives in both French and Anglophone studies. Research is also scarcer for periods of heightened repression, such as 1945–1970, compared to earlier and later periods.

Like other countries, historiography has evolved through different approaches: initially focusing on prominent homosexual figures, mostly affluent men; then on broader LGBT culture in France, emphasizing community interactions, though reliant on medical and police reports that highlighted interactions with authority; and finally, examining how medical and judicial productions shape social reality, the historicity of sexual orientation, and intersectionality with factors like gender, social class, and ethnicity.

=== Myths ===
==== Collaboration and Nazism ====
Until at least the 1980s, a persistent view portrayed the male homosexual community as particularly collaborationist, a notion not grounded in historical reality. This view depicted Nazis as hyper-masculine, attracting masculinized lesbians like Violette Morris or gay men embracing a passive role. In contrast, Marie-Jo Bonnet challenged accusations of collaboration against Morris in Violette Morris, histoire d'une scandaleuse (2011), sometimes veering into advocacy rather than historical inquiry.

==== Repression of homosexuality ====
Historian Antoine Idier identifies a myth of minimized repression, suggesting that repression in France was limited to the Vichy period and that France was an exception of freedom since the Revolution compared to repressive Europe (Paragraph 175 in Germany, gross indecency laws in the UK, torture in Francoist Spain). This minimization served a dual political role. In 1981, Robert Badinter argued that maintaining Vichy's homophobic laws, supported by the right, was a historical aberration. In 2022, it limited the scope of reparations to the 1942–1982 penalization.

=== Memory ===
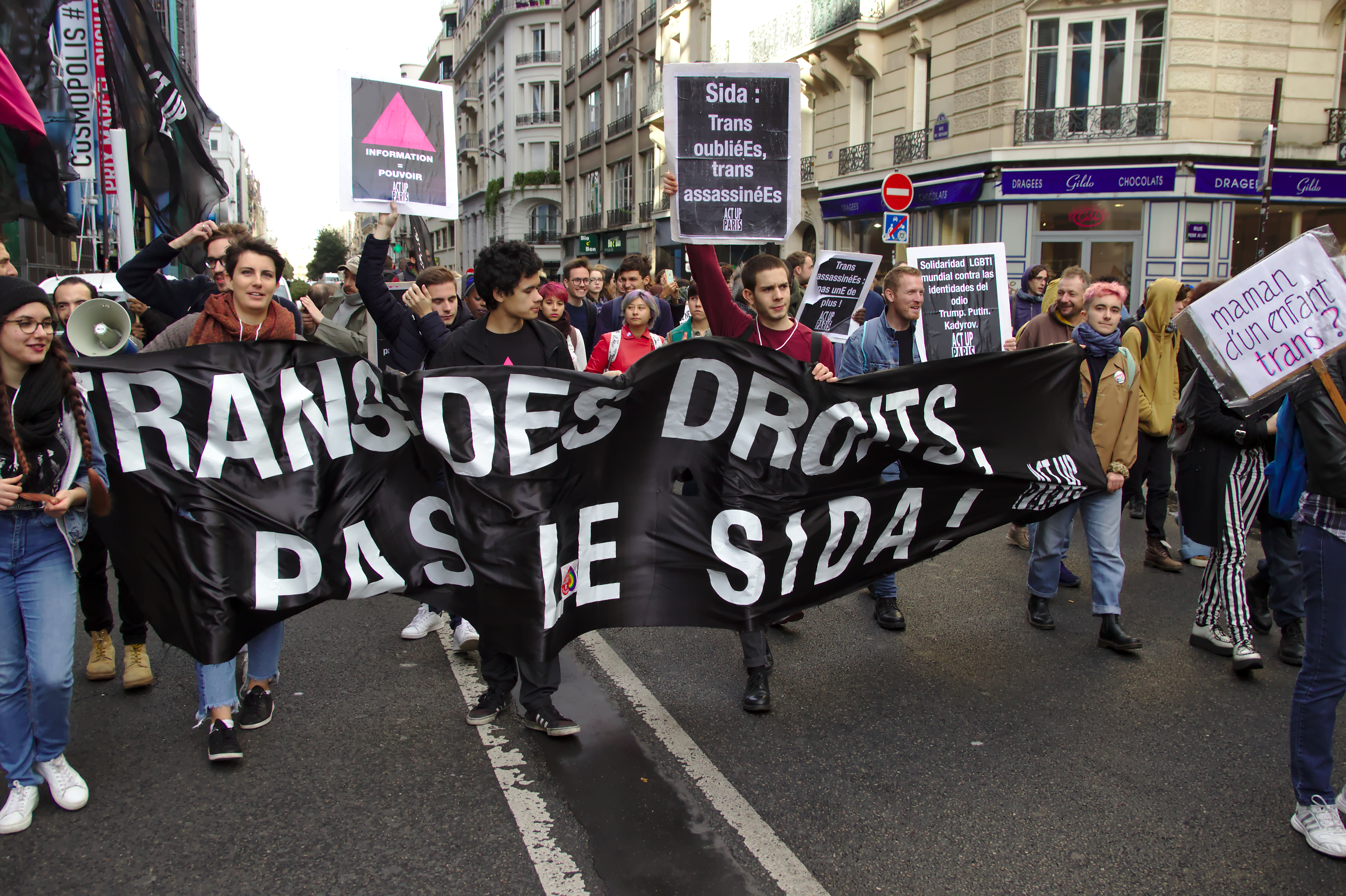
Act Up-Paris contingent at the 2017 Existrans. Founded in 1985, the association adopted the pink triangle as a symbol of LGBT struggles.

The representation of French LGBT history has evolved, shaped by homophobic interpretations and the reclamation of past eras for contemporary political goals. In the 1970s, the 1920s were rediscovered as an idealized founding myth for homosexuality. The persecution of homosexuals under Nazi Germany also began to be studied, spurred by American gay and lesbian activists and adopted by the Homosexual Front for Revolutionary Action in 1971, which reclaimed the pink triangle as a community emblem and awareness tool. Participation in the National Day of Remembrance of Deportation was a demand from 1975, recognized in 2001 by Prime Minister Lionel Jospin. Pierre Seel, a deported homosexual, spoke publicly about his experience in 1982 and published Moi, Pierre Seel, déporté homosexuel in 1994. Resistance from some political and Jewish deportee associations was strong, sometimes violent.

== See also ==
- LGBTQ rights in France
- LGBTQ culture in Paris
