= Michel-Marie Poulain =

French painter (1906-1991)

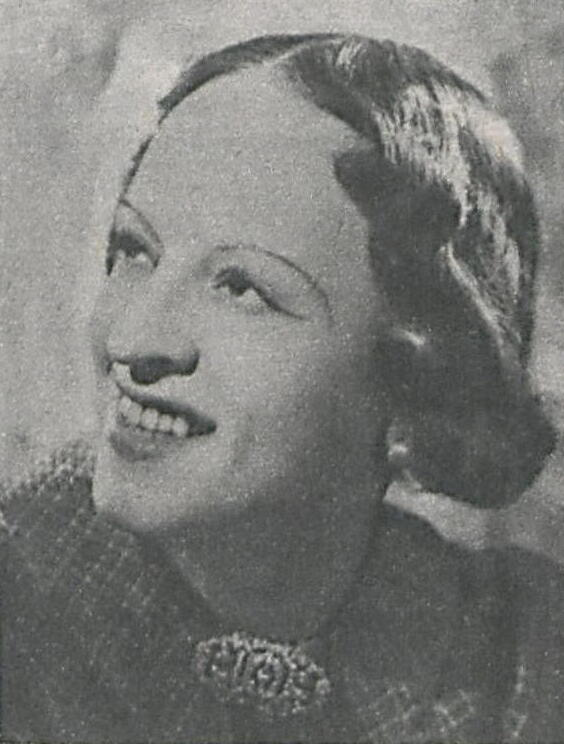
- Michel-Marie Poulain, c. 1945
- Born: Michel Edmond Aimé Poulain; 5 December 1906; Nogent-sur-Marne
- Died: 9 February 1991 (aged 84); Mandelieu-la-Napoule
- Resting place: Èze, France
- Known for: painting, drawing, frescoes, stained glass; travesti cabaret
- Movement: Expressionism, Fauvism

Signature
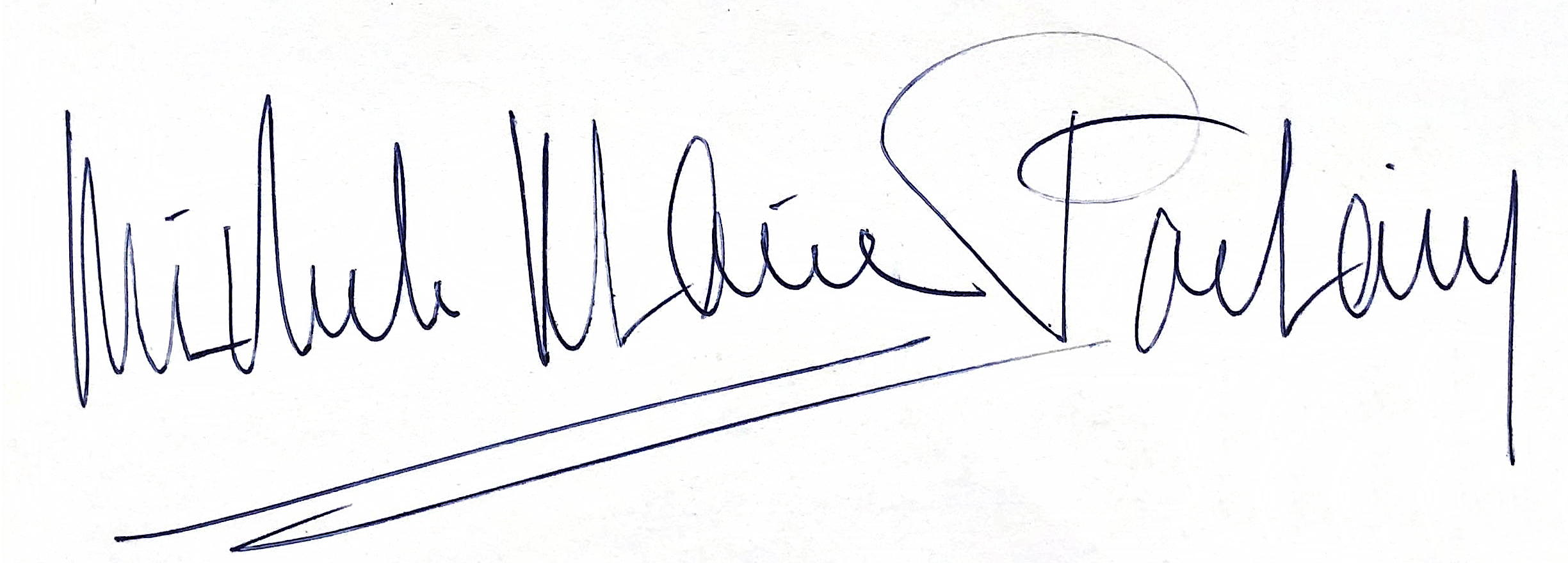

Michel-Marie Poulain (born 5 December 1906, Nogent-sur-Marne, died 9 February 1991, Mandelieu-la-Napoule) was a French transgender performer and self-taught painter whose work was influenced by Matisse and by Raoul and Jean Dufy, and whose style and technique were compared to those of Bernard Buffet and Marc Chagall.

== Education and first military service ==
Assigned male at birth, as a child Michel-Marie wore dresses at home and was sent to a girls' school before attending a boys' school (still with long hair), "a daily torment" where "schoolmates mocked and bullied 'the beautiful blonde' whom they call 'mademoiselle.' Michel-Marie, tall and strong for her age...threw a punch that sent a laughing bully tumbling to the ground...To console herself, and with the agreement of the family, she dressed as a girl every Sunday...At the age of fifteen, 'demoiselle Poulain' was taken to a jeweler who pierced her ears, and went to her first ball, not in a first tuxedo, but in a maidenly dress."

In 1926, "at the age of twenty, Michel-Marie cut her long curls for the first time," and, as a man, performed military service with a stint in the French dragoons (cavalry).

== Performer and painter ==
Returning to civilian life in Paris, Poulain lived off an inheritance for a while, and then, to earn a living, worked in female guise as a saleswoman, a dress designer, and model, whose seamstress and dresser "never suspected my true state (mon véritable état civil)." As a model, Poulain paraded couture before the equestrian set at racetracks. As an acrobat, she debuted at the Cirque d'hiver and performed with the Texas-born female impersonator, trapeze artist, and tightrope walker Barbette, until a fall from a trapeze prompted Poulain to pursue a more down-to-earth career as an acrobatic dancer, finding success as a travesti cabaret performer under the name of Micky.

When Solange, a young woman and fellow dancer, needed a place to stay, Poulain offered to share the "bachelor pad" (garçonnière). One night, Michel-Marie "behaved like a boy" with Solange, who gave birth to their daughter, Michèle. Poulain and Solange married. Solange affectionately called Poulain "Mima". Michèle called Poulain "Papa".

Poulain also found success as a self-taught painter, handling a broad range of subjects, particularly views of old Montmartre. From 1931, she took part in the Salon d'Hiver, the Salon d'Automne, the Salon des Indépendants and the Salon des Tuileries, and her work was regularly on show in Montmartre galleries and on the Left Bank in Paris.

Poulain ended the 1930s by opening her own cabaret and art gallery in Paris, Le Vol de Nuit (Night Flight), at 8, rue des Colonels Renard, a short walk from the Arc de Triomphe. A reviewer described his visit: "While tasting fruit juice and listening to poets or singers, the eye falls on the paintings of the master or mistress of the house...Renée Dennsy sings Marseille songs, Wanda Basler recites avant-garde poems, Lilet London coos in several languages, and Liane Mérève recounts dreams. However, it is Poulain, or Micky, who arouses the most curiosity. Man or woman? Host or hostess?"

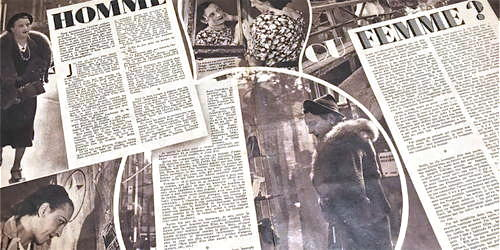
Clips from the first-person 1937 Voilà magazine article by Poulain; displayed at the Centre Pompidou in the exhibit "Over the Rainbow" in 2023. The exhibit catalog includes an entry about Poulain.

== Meetings with Magnus Hirschfeld ==
In the early 1930s, Poulain met with the sexologist Magnus Hirschfeld in Berlin, where Poulain was performing. According to Poulain, writing for the magazine Voilà in 1937, the meeting was at Hirschfeld's request.

"He wanted to see me. No doubt he thought, at first, that I was a suitable case for treatment. He soon realized that, from travesti [in the theatrical sense] to transvestism [in the sense that Hirschfeld coined the word in the early 1900s], there was more than one step, that I was neither a repressed nor an obsessive. I explained that my way of life is only about the pursuit of pleasure, and how much I valued my male state...Having realized his mistake, Hirschfeld allowed me to witness operations. In themselves, these interventions, when justified by certain physiological conditions, are not really dangerous. We cut, we size, we sew: for ignorant me, all operations look the same.

In 1933, the Nazis destroyed Hirschfeld's Institut für Sexualwissenschaft in Berlin, and the doctor fled to France. "One day, at two o'clock in the afternoon, breakfast time for night owls, Michel-Marie was struck by a headline: 'Professor Magnus Hirschfeld, founder of the Institute of Sexual Sciences in Berlin, is in Paris.'" Poulain, who had previously declined the doctor's help, had in the meantime realized "an insurmountable need to be a woman."

After an examination, Hirschfeld told Poulain:

Nature is infinitely less disciplined than men would wish; she makes a mockery of principles and traditions. Originally, the human being was, without a doubt, androgynous; the udders that adorn our breasts, the males, are proof of this. Certainly, there came a time in the depths of prehistory when the duality of the sexes intervened, but man is separated from woman only by a tiny gulf. Some humans carry within them the genesis of two sexes with a more or less precise development in one direction or another. As far as you are concerned, I think that there is more or less equality, but there is a fairly clear tendency in favor of femininity...If you wish, by a series of operations, I can make you a normal woman."

Poulain seriously considered the doctor's offer, but was daunted by the tragic fate of another painter, Lili Elbe (born Einar Wegener), a Dane who whose memoirs had been published in a weekly newspaper under the suggestive title of "Vice Versa." Elbe had also consulted Hirschfeld, and had undergone three operations to change sex from male to female. But complications resulting from a fourth operation led to Elbe's death in 1931. Poulain declined Hirschfeld's offer to operate.

== World War II ==
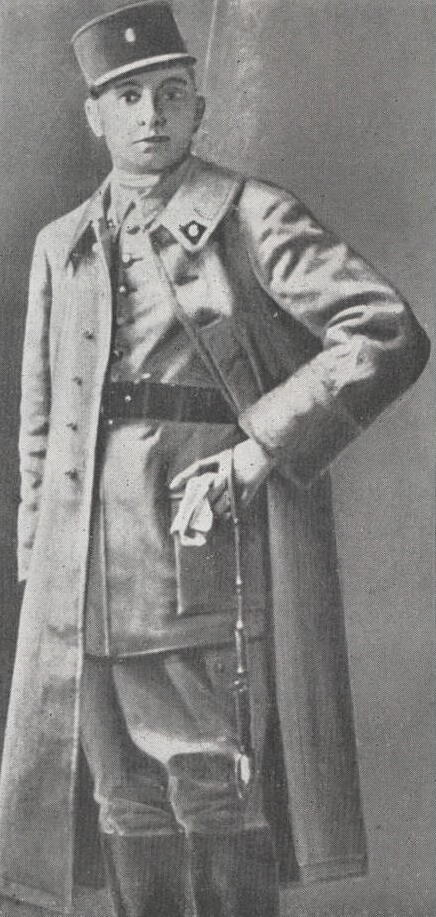
Poulain in uniform (source: gallica.bnf.fr/BnF).

The party at Le Vol de Nuit was short-lived. By the end of 1939, the war had begun and Poulain had enlisted as a non-commissioned officer of dragoons. Jean Anouilh recalled seeing him ride horses in the woods near Le Touquet. Poulain "led his men into the fire while maintaining a feminine attitude: holding the carabiner in his right hand, he could not help but push back, at times, with a graceful gesture, under his helmet, a lock of bleached hair that in spite of regulations he had allowed to grow back."

During a reconnaissance, Poulain was taken by the Germans and imprisoned at Stalag XI-B. While in captivity, Poulain put on shows for fellow POWs. Her feminine performances earned her the gratitude of other soldiers in need of escapism. Poulain kept as a treasured memento a "theater program" signed by comrades: "To you, for the feminine charm that you have allowed us to rediscover"; "To you, old comrade, for your kindness"; "To you, who knew how to create the illusion."

Poulain escaped from the stalag "in 1941, armed with false papers...and dressed in men's clothes! Without knowing German, he managed as he was able, and from Poland, returned to France. Michel slayed the dragon [dragoon] within him, Marie adopted the latest hairstyle, and life resumed as if waking from a bad dream."

Back in German-occupied Paris, Poulain "abandoned the music hall to devote himself to painting." In June 1943, she had a show at Galerie Paul Blauseur in Paris, and in December 1943, she was on hand to discuss her art on display in the bar of the Cirque d'hiver. Poulain's persona and painting were equal parts of the presentation; a review of her post-war show at Galerie Paul Blauser in March 1945 was headlined "This Woman is a Man, This Man is a Painter!", and reported, "After the war and the stalag, the civilian costume he wears is that of the most formidable vamps in Paris."

== Post-war transition ==
After the war, Poulain overcame her fear of operations and "decided to change her sex in 1946 by undergoing several surgeries." Throughout the long and arduous process, she recalled repeating to herself over and over, "I will have the courage, I will have the courage to the end." The name of the doctor who performed the operations is not known.

After the transition, Poulain's daughter Michèle continued to address her as "Papa," even in public. It is unclear whether Poulain and Solange continued to live as a married couple.

Jean Anouilh, who had known Poulain as a male cavalry officer, and who found himself living next-door to Poulain after the war, was "only half-surprised...The war, the occupation, the liberation, have accustomed us to such volte-faces."

Poulain actively courted publicity, but appears to have kept her surgical transition a personal secret for several years. Articles and interviews from 1946 (the year of her surgeries) to 1954 (when her "tell-all" book J'ai choisi mon sexe was published) portray Poulain as a heterosexual man (citing his marriage and child) who happened to dress exclusively as a woman. Poulain in interviews tacitly accepted or even encouraged this gender portrayal.

== Height of career ==
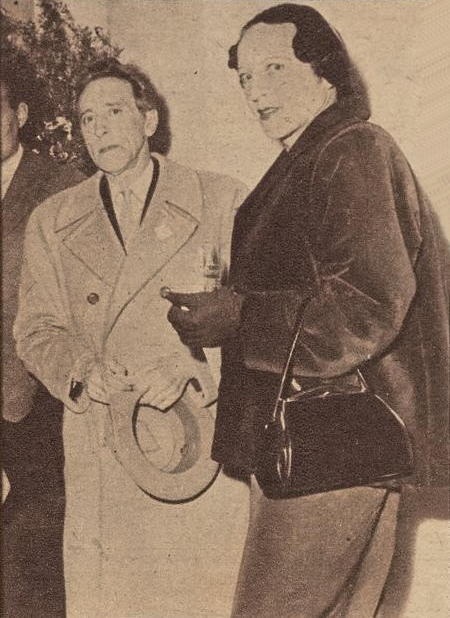
Jean Cocteau and Poulain at a theater in Paris, c. 1951 (source: gallica.bnf.fr/BnF).

At the peak of her success as a painter in the late 1940s and 1950s, Poulain exhibited as far afield as Stockholm, Madrid, New York and Rio de Janeiro, and opened her own gallery in Cannes to exhibit her paintings. 1953 saw the publication of Michel-Marie Poulain, an art book with a preface by Michel Mourre; essays by André Warnod, Pierre Imbourg, and Jean Anouilh originally written for exhibitions of Poulain's work in Paris in, respectively, 1945, 1946, and 1947; 8 color plates, and 24 black and white reproductions.

She also practiced the art of stained glass and mural frescoes for churches in the Alpes-Maritimes department of France, producing stained glass windows for the abbey La Colle-sur-Loup; creating stained glass and eleven commissioned paintings for the Chapelle Sainte-Croix, des Pénitents Blancs in Èze, c. 1953; and decorating the chapel of Saint Sebastian in Sainte-Agnès, Alpes-Maritimes.

Success allowed Poulain to live and work in Èze on the French Riviera, where she kept an atelier on the rue Principale. She also kept a residence in Paris at 26 Avenue Trudaine, the address hand-written by Poulaine on the verso of numerous paintings from the 1950s.

1954 saw the publication, in paperback, of J'ai choisi mon sexe: Confidences du peintre Michel-Marie Poulain, essentially an autobiography by Poulain as told to the author, Claude Marais, in which she shared details of her childhood, discussed her meetings with Hirschfeld, and revealed details of her operations.

== Death ==
Poulain was buried in Èze, sharing a gravestone with Alice Colette Richter (1892-1961) and Jeanne Floch (1916-).

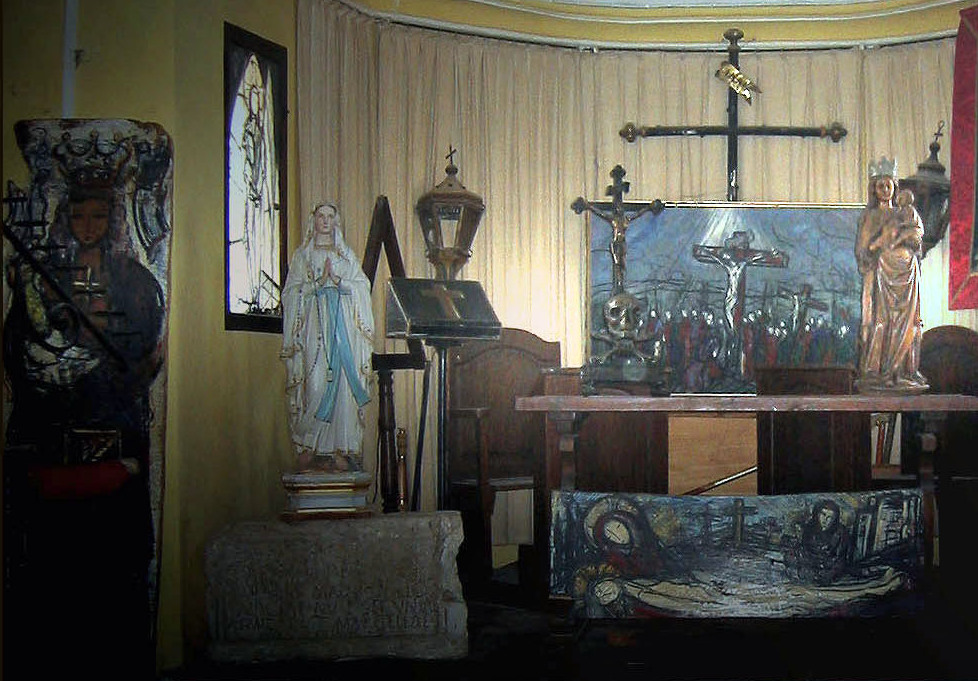
A stained glass window and three paintings by Poulain in the Chapelle Sainte-Croix, des Pénitents Blancs in Èze, France (clockwise from left): La Vierge à l'Enfant, La Crucifixion, and La Déploration du Christ.

== Themes and reception ==
Renate Treydel in the Allgemeines Künstlerlexikon gives an overview of Poulain's oeuvre as a painter:

The long-term process of finding her gender identity is reflected in her art and leads to a particularly subtle figurative painting style characterized by opposites. Powerful, sketchy, fleeting lines are paired with a gentle, soft brushwork, and a certain severity is mitigated by figures radiating feminine grace. Poulain paints very lively, strongly moving depictions in mostly bold colours (Au Théâtre, c. 1950), sometimes in bright colors based on Fauvist models (Marseille, le pont transbordeur, 1944). Black contoured pictorial elements and roughly hatched backgrounds lead to comparison with paintings by Bernard Buffet (Rue Norvins, Place du Tertre, Montmartre, Paris, 1967). Subjects mostly touch on her own sensitivities and living conditions; many motifs show two women (La loge, 1949) or mother and child (Mère et enfant, watercolor), as well as flashes from the theatre, variety shows and cabaret milieu (Les danseuses de cancan). In addition to other figure paintings depicting scenes of everyday life (Partie d'échec), she also created portraits (Portrait de femme au bouquet, 1959), urban views from Paris and the South of France (Saint Paul de Vence, 1951), harbor motifs (Le port de Concarneau) and still lifes, especially lavish floral arrangements (Bouquet de fleurs, 1943).

Poulain said of her work: "What I'm looking for is the sense of movement. I want my dancers to dance, my sailors to sway, the leaves of the trees to quiver in the wind. I strive to discover new aesthetic rules so that others can work in this direction, after me."

Poulain's detractors typically took a dismissive tone and focused on the artist's gender presentation and entertainment career. Georges Pillement, in a caustic review disparaging the art scene of 1948 Paris titled "Des Indépendants sans Indépendance," wrote:

There is also Michel-Marie Poulain, who performed in the circus and whose great originality is to dress as a woman. His characters are an attraction: just think, he is there with his wife and his daughter, painted, elegant. It's a riddle: who is the man? And since his painting, quite skillful, is made to please, he sells, I was assured, four or five million paintings a year. Also, he multiplies the gallery openings. The last one took place at night—more chic. Poor snobs! We must discourage artists and, above all, faux artists.

Jean Anouilh wrote that Poulain's art transcended prurient interest, as the artist transcended gender:

"Scandal, which always surrounds freedom, must not reflect on his work. Poulain is not an amusing figure of the Parisian fauna who also paints canvases, he is above all an artist, or better, a robust worker conscientious before the laws of his art...Michel-Marie Poulain, dressed as a young girl in his studio in Montmartre...it was he who did the work of creator, that is to say, of man in the best sense of the word."

== Exhibitions ==
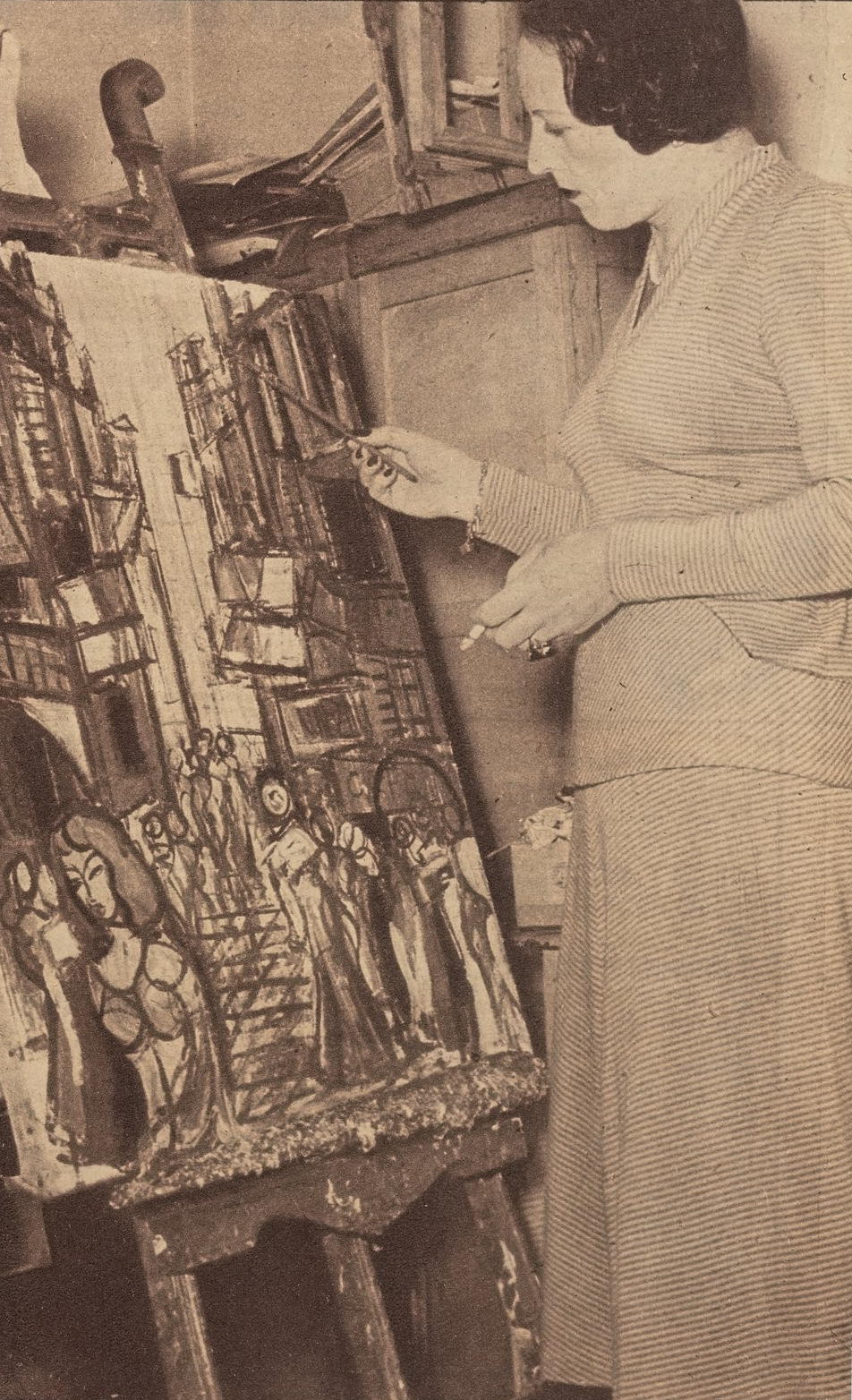
Poulain in her atelier, c. 1951 (source: gallica.bnf.fr/BnF).

=== Individual ===
- Galerie Clausen, Paris, July 1938.
- Galerie Paul Blauseur, Paris, June 1943; March 1945; November 1946.
- Galerie Clausen, Paris, May 1947.
- Galerie d'art du Faubourg, Paris, March 1948.
- Galerie André Weil, Paris, April 1953.
- Galerie Sélection, Paris, 1955.
- Galerie Breughel, Paris, 1956.
- Galerie Vendôme, Paris, 1957.
- Galerie Marcel Bernheim, Paris, December 1963.

=== Collective ===
- Salon d'Hiver, Salon d'Automne, Salon des Indépendants and Salon des Tuileries, Paris, from 1931.
- Philippe Marie Picard/Michel-Marie Poulain/Gerard Sekoto, Galerie Heyrène, Paris, 1952.

== Collections ==
=== Private ===
- The Luxembourg architect Paul Retter, a patron of Michel-Marie Poulain, owned many paintings which, after the collector's death in 1980, were sold at auction. Most, like those depicting Bettembourg and the dancing procession of Echternach, have remained in Luxembourger hands.
- Albert Sarraut.
- Charles Trenet, who said he found in Poulain's work "a reflection of his own poetic zaniness" ("un reflet de sa propre loufoquerie poétique").

=== Public ===
- Musée National d'Art Moderne, Centre Pompidou, Paris: La partie de cartes, oil painting.
- Centre national des arts plastiques (Cnap), Paris: Cathédrale de Strasbourg (c. 1946), oil on panel; Femme au châle (1953), oil on panel.
- Musée Renoir de Cagnes-sur-Mer: Toulon, oil painting.
- Société muséale Albert-Figuiera, Èze: Portrait de Clorine Cottier-Abeille, 1950, drawing.
- French Embassy, Managua: Le bridge (by 1945), oil on canvas.

== Bibliography ==
- Anouilh, Jean, Imbourg, Pierre, and Warnod, André; Mourre, Michel (preface). Michel-Marie Poulain, Presses de Braun et Cie, 1953.
- Bénézit, Emmanuel. Dictionnaire des peintres, sculpteurs, dessinateurs et graveurs, Gründ, 1999, tome 11, p. 184.
- Bruyez, Robert. "L'habit ne fait pas (toujours)...le sexe" in La Cité, February 1, 1959, pp. 39-42.
- Castel, Pierre-Henri. "Chronologie et bibliographie représentative du transsexualisme et des pathologies de l'identité sexuelle de 1910 à 1998", appendix to La métamorphose impensable. Essai sur le transsexualisme et l'identité personnelle, Paris: Gallimard, 2003.
- "Cette Elegante Brune n'est Autre que Michel-Marie Poulain", La Presse, June 17, 1947, p. 3.
- Chardans Jean-Louis. History and Anthology of Homosexuality/Histoire et anthologie de l'homosexualité, bilingual French/English edition, British Group of Sexological Research/Le Centre d'Études et de documentation pédagogiques, 1970.
- Flâneur des Deux Rives, Le. "D’Une Rive à l’Autre", May 15, 1946, p. 6.
- Foerster, Maxime; Caillavet, Henri (preface). Une histoire des transsexuels en France, Béziers: H&O, 2006; reissued as Elle ou lui? Une histoire des transsexuels en France, Paris: La Musardine, 2012.
- Fréjaville, Gustave. Michel-Marie Poulain, Éditions de la Galerie Clausen, Paris, 1938.
- Gleyze, Valentin. "Michel-Marie Poulain" in Nicolas Liucci-Goutnikov (dir.), Over the Rainbow: Autres histoires de la sexualité dans les collections du Centre Pompidou (catalog for the exhibit June 28—November 13, 2023), 2023.
- Héraut, Henri. "Les expositions: Michel-Marie Poulain," Journal de l'amateur d'art, n° 202, 25 December 1957.
- Imbourg, Pierre. Michel-Marie Poulain, Éditions de la Galerie Paul Blauseur, Paris, 1946.
- Lacoste, Marcel. "La Passion du Travesti", p. 11 in Qui? Detective, no. 254, May 14, 1951.
- Marais, Claude. J'ai choisi mon sexe: Confidences du peintre Michel-Marie Poulain, Monaco, Les éditions de Fontvieille, 1954.
- Piéral. Vu d'en bas, Paris: Robert Laffont, 1976, p. 239.
- Pillement, Georges. "Des Indépendants sans Indépendance", Les Lettres Francaises, March 11, 1948, p. 4.
- Poulain, Michel-Marie. École de Paris, Brussels: privately published, 1960.
- Rapazzini, Francesco. Indomptables: À l'avant-garde du XXe siècle, Éditions Edite, 2013.
- Rapazzini, Francesco. Le Moulin Rouge en folies: Quand le cabaret le plus célèbre du monde inspire les artistes, Le Cherche Midi, 2016.
- Roussard, André. Dictionnaire des Peintres à Montmartre, Éditions André Roussard, 1999.
- Sauzon, Virginie (2013). "Un transgenre grammatical?: la tension linguistique dans Les Adolescents troglodytes d'Emmanuelle Pagano". L'Esprit Créateur. 53 (1): 74–86. ISSN 0014-0767. JSTOR 26378825.
- Schurr, Gérald. Le guidargus de la peinture, Les Éditions de l'Amateur, 1993.
- Treydel, Renate. "Poulain, Michel-Marie" in Allgemeines KünstlerLexikon, Die Bildenden Künstler aller Zeiten und Völker, vol. 95, p. 426, Berlin/Boston: Walter de Gruyter GmbH, 2017.
- Vanderpyl, "Les peintres au cirque", Paris-Soir, December 28, 1943.
- Veber, Serge. "Vol de Nuit: L’enigmatique Micky", L'Intransigeant, June 11, 1939, p. 6
