= Jean-Pierre Ceytaire =

French painter

Jean-Pierre Ceytaire (born May 26, 1946 in Paris) is a French painter exhibiting his work since 1983.

== Biography ==
Born and raised in Montmartre, his schooling bring him to a degree in physical therapy, which he practiced for fifteen years. Jean-Pierre Ceytaire discovers painting during his military service.

In 1986 Jean-Pierre Ceytaire quits his job as a physical therapist in order to pursue his artistic impulses. Although categorized mostly as erotic art his work builds on themes from religious art. Quickly he creates a unique style showcased in several exhibits. Jean-Pierre Ceytaire currently lives in Carrières-sur-Seine.

== Exhibits ==
Jean-Pierre Ceytaire has been showing his work in individual exhibits since 1973 and in collective exhibits since 1983. The exhibits mostly occurred in France but he also exhibited in Switzerland, Belgium, Germany, Denmark, Russia and the United States. Several media have been covering Jean-Pierre Ceytaire's art.

== Bibliography (partial) ==
Limited edition

- Chair rouge
- Muse m'exaspère
- Bonnes et valets
- Le peintre s'amuse (novel)

Articles on Jean-Pierre Ceytaire

- L'Amateur d'Art, May 1991, interview with Jean-Pierre Thiollet.
