= L'Amateur d'Art =

French visual arts magazine

- Frequency: Monthly
- Country: France
- Language: French
- ISSN: 0988-6672

L'Amateur d'Art (or Journal de l'amateur d'art), in English, the Art Amateur, is a former French monthly magazine, specialized in visual arts.

== History ==
Its purpose was to introduce or better understand the creative approach or works of many contemporary artists, both figurative and abstract, including Raphy, Alfred Reth, Ladislas Kijno, Alexandre Frenel, Jean-Pierre Ceytaire, Étienne Ritter, Joseph Espalioux, Alexis Hinsberger, Bernard Conte, Pierre Jutand, Tomaso Pomentale, and the sculptor Charles Machet.

Among the most renowned contributors to this publication over the decades were Gilbert Prouteau, Jean-Pierre Thiollet, Georges Pillement, Jacques Dubois, Nicole Lamothe and Pierre Mornand.

== Director ==
Well known Parisian art dealer in the post-war era, Michel Boutin was its director during the 1970s-1980s. The publication ceased in the early 1990s, shortly after his death.
