= Thérèse Pierre =

French Resistance hero (1908–1943)

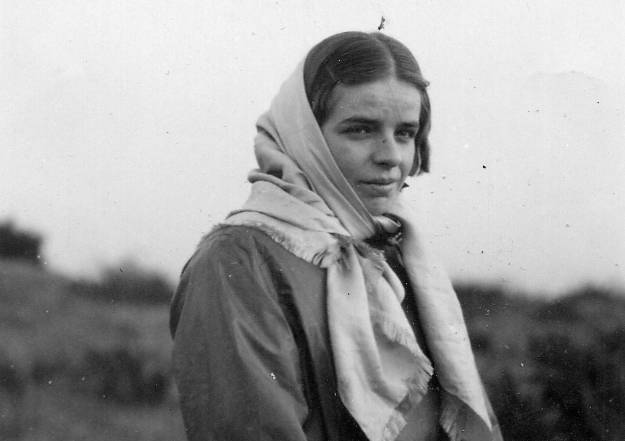
- Born: Thérèse Madeleine Pierre; 5 November 1908; Épernay, France
- Died: 26 October 1943 (aged 34); Rennes, France
- Occupation: Teacher
- Spouse: Emma Pitoizet

Thérèse Madeleine Pierre (French pronunciation: [teɾɛzə pjɛrə]; 5 November 1908 – 26 October 1943) was a French Resistance fighter. She died after she was tortured by the German Gestapo.

== Early life ==
Thérèse Pierre was born on 5 November 1908 in Épernay, Marne. Her parents were teachers. She got the first part of the professorship in 1929. She was appointed to Évreux, then to Felletin, and became a lecturer at Bar-le-Duc, Vitré, Redon, and Fougeres.

== Resistance fighter ==
At Carhaix, at the beginning of 1942, she met a Finistere Resistance official, the future Lieutenant-Colonel Pascal. Thérèse Pierre was 34 years old and had a history as a communist activist. Transferred to Fougères, she became the head of the borough, in September 1942, under the name of Madeleine. She participated in the organization of Francs-Tireurs et Partisans groups and their weapons. She had more than a hundred men under her responsibility. She was in contact with the regional chiefs and with the resistance fighters. She was arrested on October 23, 1943 in Fougères by the Sicherheitsdienst (SD, SS Intelligence Service), and transferred to Rennes. On October 27, 2013, a plaque was unveiled on the facade of the house she lived at 32, rue des Prés in Fougères. On the occasion of the inauguration of a commemorative plaque at the Thérèse Pierre de Fougères College, on October 27, 1979, Mrs. Germaine Guénée, a resister and close friend of Thérèse Pierre, stated:

She was cautious and at the same time daring, which made her succeed in everything she did. It is absolutely remarkable that no resistance, under his orders, was taken in the course of actions carried out by her or with her ... She passed from a frank cordiality to short and dazzling anger when the safety of the Resistance was in danger because of carelessness or gossip or imprudence. She subjugated everyone since the F.T.P. from 17 who could have been his sons to the old militants who could have been his parents.

Testimony: "Thérèse Pierre? Her ordeal and death are in many memories, but their details are not well known. Transferred to Jacques-Cartier Prison, she was tortured hour by hour from her arrest until her death, beaten and flogged for two consecutive days. She remained in contact with her prison mates through the central heating channel. Madame Lequeu, of Dol, received her last words. The body was completely bruised, she dragged herself on the floor of her cell, sobbed, screamed in pain, repeated tirelessly: "I will not speak ... They will not make me talk." Towards the end of this second day, she said distinctly: "They got nothing from me ..." The next morning, she was found hanging from the bars of her jail with one of her stockings. This was alleged to be a German-staged suicide. Her funeral took place at the cathedral of Rennes, where her body was transported from the morgue."

== Recognition ==
Thérèse Pierre was awarded the Croix de Guerre 1939–1945 with silver star and made a knight of the Legion of Honour. She was posthumously awarded the Resistance Medal in 1946. Two schools bear her name: the École maternelle Thérèse Pierre of Bar-le-Duc and the Collège Thérèse Pierre of Fougères.

Robin Hunzinger's 2007 documentary Where are our lovers (Où sont nos amoureuses) retraces her story, alongside that of Emma Pitoizet.

A street in the 17th arrondissement of Paris was named after her: the Promenade Thérèse-Pierre, which in turn gave its name to a tram stop, Thérèse Pierre on Line 3b.

== Sources ==
- Claudie Hunzinger, Elles vivaient d'espoir, 2010
- Catherine Dufour, "Guide des métiers pour les petites filles qui ne veulent pas finir princesses," chap. 41 : Résistante, éd. Fayard, 2014, (ISBN 9782213683676)
- Germaine Dulong-Guénée, "Hommage à la Résistance dans le Pays de Fougères", Le Pays de Fougères, n°22, 1979
