= Joseph Fiévée =

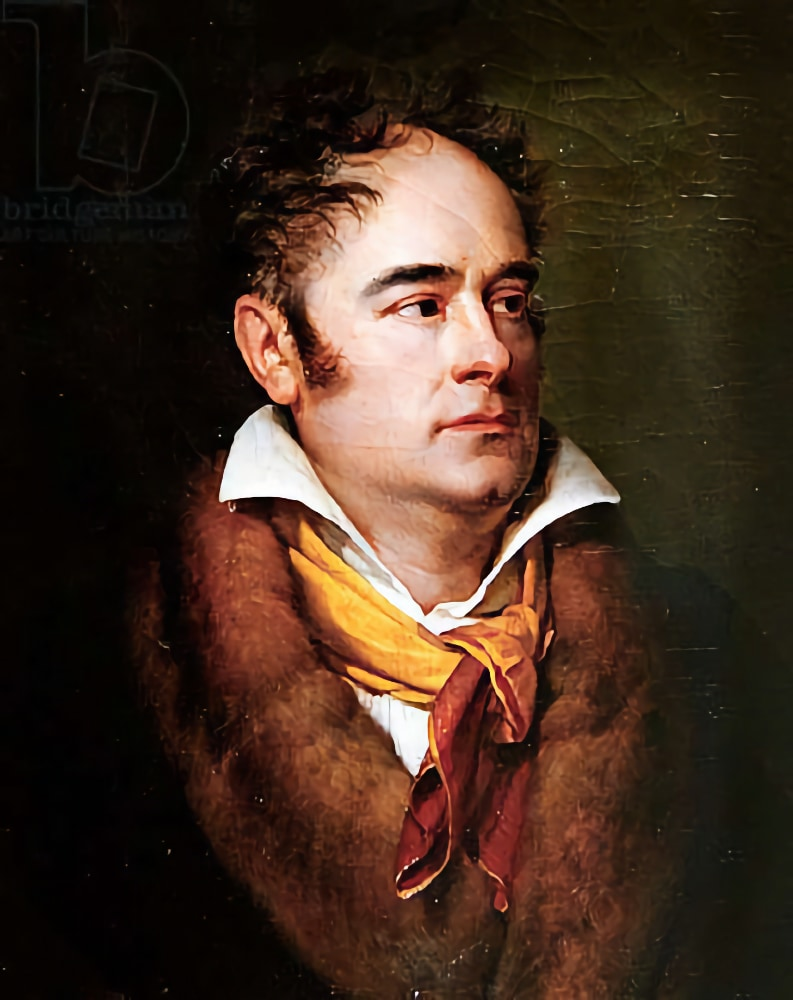
Joseph Fiévée

Joseph Fiévée (9 April 1767 – 8 May 1839) was a French journalist, novelist, essayist, playwright, civil servant (haut fonctionnaire) and secret agent. He also lived in an openly gay relationship with the writer Théodore Leclercq (1777–1851), with whom he was buried after his death.

== Career ==
Fiévée was born and died in Paris. The son of a restaurant owner, he became a publisher during the French Revolution, most notably editing La Chronique de Paris, a newspaper; it was here that he started his career as journalist, but unfortunately incurred the suspicion of authorities who had him imprisoned during the Reign of Terror. He was a member of the royalist network around the Abbey de Montesquiou, and was forced to go into hiding during the Directoire. While in hiding, he wrote his novel on changing times and mores, La Dot de Suzette, which was a great literary success.

From 1800 to 1803, he wrote a column for the Gazette de France. He was again imprisoned in the Temple (Paris) by order of Joseph Fouché, but he was freed at the request of Bonaparte. He became a kind of secret agent for Napoleon, informing him of political affairs in France and England.

From 1804 to 1807, he was editor in chief of the Journal des débats, which became Journal de l'Empire. He was ennobled by the Emperor; was named "maître des requêtes" to the Conseil d'État in 1810; then "Préfet" of the Nièvre department from 1813 to 1815.

A supporter of Louis XVIII during the initial Restoration, he was banished during the Hundred Days. Having become one of the intellectuals of the "ultra" party and writer for the papers La Quotidienne and the Conservateur, he eventually became more politically liberal after 1818. A strong supporter of the freedom of the press, he was sentenced to three months of prison in the Conciergerie where Casimir Perier visited him.

He became a contributor to the journals Temps in 1829 and National in 1831.

== Private life ==
Joseph Fiévée married in 1790 (his brother-in-law was Charles Frédéric Perlet), but his wife died giving birth, leaving him one child. At the end of the 1790s, he met the writer Théodore Leclercq who became his life companion, and the two would live and raise Fiévée's son together. When becoming Préfet, Fiévée and Leclercq moved to the Nièvre department, and their open relationship greatly shocked some locals. The two men were received together in the salons of the Restoration.

Both men are buried in the same tomb at Père Lachaise Cemetery.

== Works ==
Novels :

- La Dot de Suzette (1798) (BNF 1)
- Frédéric (1799) (BNF 2)

Letters :

- Lettres sur l'Angleterre (1803)
- Correspondance politique et administrative, Ed. Le Normant (1816)
- Lettres sur le projet d'organisation municipale (présentées à la Chambre des Députés le 21 février 1821), Le Normant (1821)
- Correspondances et relations de J. Fiévée avec Bonaparte de 1802 à 1813, en 3 volumes, Ed. Desrez et Beauvais (1836)
- Correspondance de J. Fiévée et de François Ferrier, de 1803 à 1837

Essays :

- De la religion considérée dans ses rapports avec le but de toute législation (1795)
- Du dix-huit brumaire opposé au système de la Terreur (1802) (BNF 3)
- Réflexions sur la philosophie du XVIIIe siècle, Ed. Perlet-Desenne (1802)
- Conseils à Napoléon 1802-1803
- Des opinions et des intérêts pendant la Révolution (1809)
- Histoire de la session de 1815, Ed. L'Huillier-Delaunay (1816)
- Histoire de la session de 1816, Le Normant (1817)
- Histoire de la session de 1817, Le Normant (1818)
- Examen des discussions relatives à la loi des élections pendant la session de 1819, Le Normant (1820)
- Histoire de la session de 1820, Le Normant (1821)
- Ce que tout le monde pense, ce que personne ne dit, Le Normant (1821)
- De l'Espagne et des conséquences de l'intervention armée (1823)
- Causes et conséquences du mois de juillet 1830 (1830)

Short Stories:

- Le divorce, le faux révolutionnaire et l'héroïsme des femmes, Ed. A. Duleau (1802)

Theatre :

- La maison à vendre (1789)
- Le badinage dangereux (1789)
- Les rigueurs du cloître (1790)

== Honors ==
Chevalier de la Légion d'honneur (1812)
