= Georges Pillement =

French writer, translator and photographer

Georges Pillement (23 March 1898 – 14 April 1984) was a French writer, translator and photographer. He was born in Mayet in the Loire region. He won the Prix des Deux Magots for his novel Plaisir d'amour in 1937.

From 1941, he published books devoted to the preservation of ancient monuments and continued his work on television, as well as the establishment of associations and a traveling exhibition in the 1960s.

With Gilbert Prouteau and Jean-Pierre Thiollet, he was one of the renowned writers of a French magazine, L'Amateur d'Art.

== Main works ==
Anthologies

- Anthologie du théâtre français contemporain, 3 volumes :
  - Tome 1 : Le Théâtre d'avant-garde, éditions du Bélier, coll. "Les documents littéraires", Paris, [between 1945 and 1948]
  - Tome 2 : Le Théâtre du boulevard, éditions du Bélier, coll. "Les documents littéraires", [between 1945 and 1948]
  - Tome 3 : Le Théâtre des romanciers et poètes, éditions du Bélier, coll. "Les documents littéraires", [between 1945 and 1948]
- Anthologie de la poésie amoureuse, 2 volumes :
  - Tome 1, éditions du Bélier, Paris, 1954,
  - Tome 2, éditions du Bélier, Paris, 1955,
- Anthologie des lettres d'amour, éditions du Bélier, Paris, 1956,

- Plaisir d'amour, 1937, Prix des Deux Magots
- Beautés cachées de la France, Centre et Sud, éditions des Deux mondes, Paris, 1951, – Réédition à l'identique : éditions H. Veyrier, Paris, 1966.
- Les cathédrales de France (avec des pointes sèches de Charles Samson), éditions d'art les Heures claires, 1958,

Photographs

- Les Cathédrales d'Espagne, 3 volumes (texts and photographs by Georges Pillement) :
  - Tome 1, éditions Bellenand, coll. « Bibliothèque d'art et d'histoire », 1951, Paris,
  - Tome 2, éditions Bellenand, coll. « Bibliothèque d'art et d'histoire », 1952, Paris,
  - Tome 3, éditions Bellenand, coll. « Bibliothèque d'art et d'histoire », 1952, Paris,
- L'Espagne inconnue : itinéraires archéologiques (texts and photographs), éditions Bernard Grasset, 1954,

Novels

- François-les-Bas-Bleus, éditions Fayard, Paris, 1938, – Réédition : Éditions de la Nouvelle revue Belgique, Paris et Bruxelles, 1942,

Other

- Destruction de Paris, éditions Bernard Grasset, Paris, 1941,
- Le Château de Fontainebleau (ouvrage trilingue en français, allemand et espagnol, textes de Georges Pillement, photographies de Marc Foucault, sous la direction artistique de Emmanuel Boudot-Lamotte), éditions Tel, Paris, 1942,
- Saccage de la France(illustré de 32 planches hors-texte en héliogravure) Édition Bernard Grasset, Paris, 1943
- Défense et illustration d’Avignon) (textes de Georges Pillement, couverture composée d'un bois gravé et dessiné par Robert Joël), éditions Bernard Grasset, Paris, 1945,
- Demeures parisiennes en péril, éditions Bernard Grasset, Paris, 1948,
- Cloîtres et abbayes de France, éditions des Deux mondes, Paris, 1950,
- Charme de Paris (textes de Georges Pillement, aquarelles de J.-M. Le Tournier, éditions H. Piazza, Paris, 1959,
- Du Cotentin, pays secret, au vert Bocage (textes de Georges Pillement, illustrations de Marguerite Mackain-Langlois, éditions Aux dépens d'un mateur, Paris, 1966,
- Les Environs de Paris disparus, éditions Albin Michel, Paris, 1968,
- Châteaux de France, éditions Gautier-Languereau, coll. « Jeunes bibliophiles », Paris, 1969,
- Liban, Syrie et Chypre inconnus, Albin Michel, coll. « Les guides Pillement », 1971
- "Paris Poubelle", éditions Jean-Jacques Pauvert (ISBN 9782720200014), Paris, 1974, 206 p.
- Pillement, Georges (1976). Du Paris des rois au Paris des promoteurs. Les Cahiers de l'écologie. Paris: éditions Entente. ISBN 2726600239.
- Ernest Kosmowski, Éditions Visages du monde, Paris, 1978,
- La Bretagne inconnue, éditions Pierre Belfond, coll. « Guide-itinéraires », Paris, 1979, 32 p. de planches illustrées, ISBN 2-7144-1214-9.
- La Grèce inconnue , éditions Albin Michel, coll." Les Guides Pillement", 1969, 430 p.
