= Bi'Cause =

French bi/pansexuality association

- Formation: May 27, 1997; 29 years ago
- Type: Bisexuality awareness organisation
- Headquarters: LGBTQI+ Center of Paris and Île-de-France
- Publication: Bi'llet + Pan'carte
- Affiliations: Inter-LGBT; Assault and Discrimination Support Network
- Website: bicause.fr

Bi'Cause is a French bisexual and pansexual advocacy group. It was the first bisexuality focussed organisation in France.

== History ==
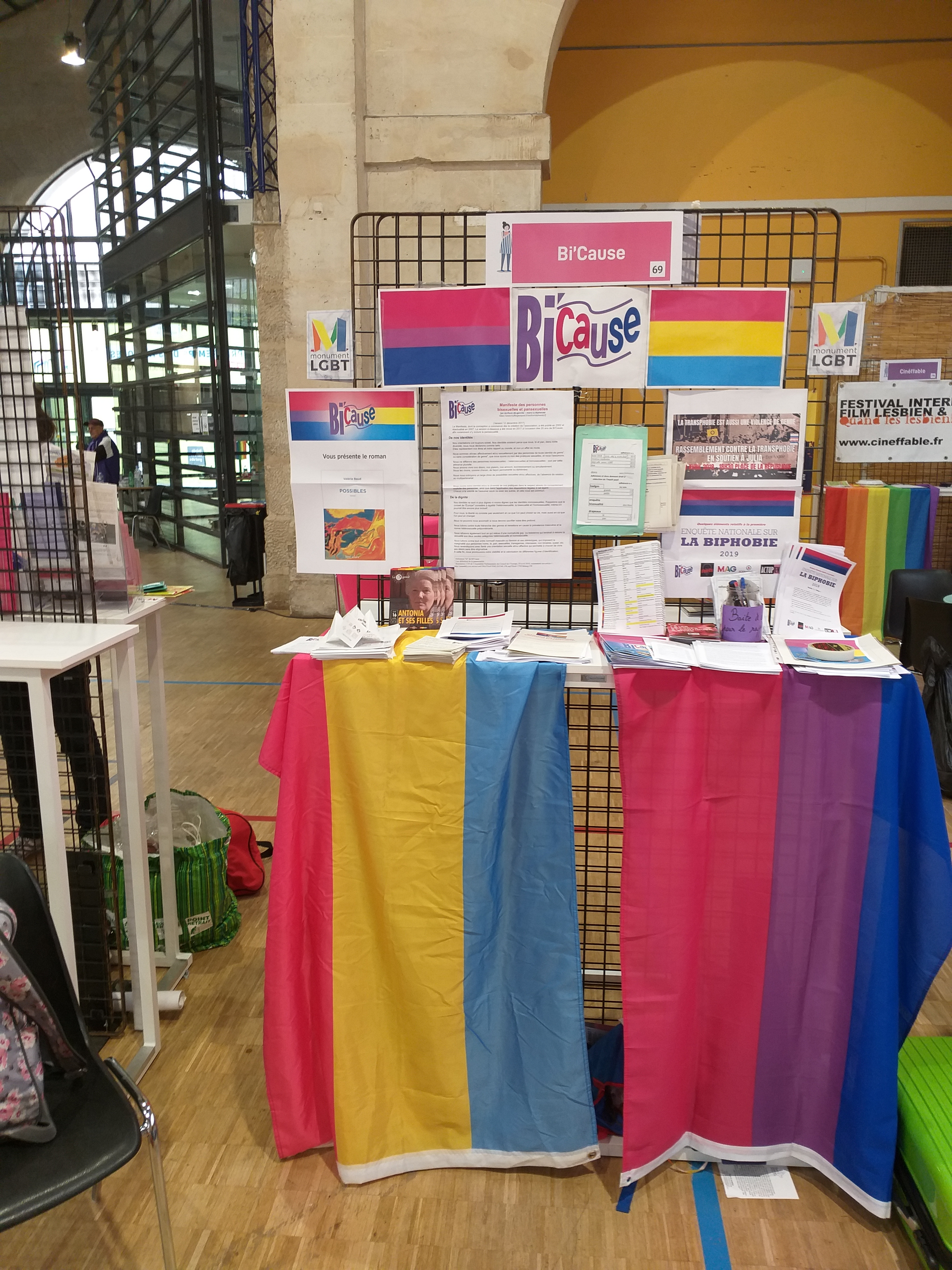
Bi'Cause stand at the Printemps des Assoces in 2019

In 1995, a group of four bisexual women left a lesbian discussion circle after being rejected. They began hosting discussion groups around biphobia and bisexual rights in the LGBTQI+ Center of Paris and Île-de-France, a LGBTQ+ resource centre in Paris.

A newsletter called Bi'Cause was first published in 1996 by the group.

In May 1997, Bi'Cause was transformed into a think tank, advocacy group and legal association, to create a space for discussion. At the time, it was the only solely bisexual advocacy group in France.

The same year, it participated in EuroPride in Paris and in 1998 they participated in their first Paris Pride. They also participated in the sixth BiCon, an annual gathering of the bisexual community in England. Since 2006, Bi'Cause have also attended ExisTrans (later ExisTransInter), a trans and intersex awareness march.

In 2001, they organised and hosted the first Bisexuality Forum in Paris, organised with the Swiss LGBTQ+ rights group, VoGay. Sociologist Daniel Welzer-Lang was one of the keynote speakers.

Since 2009, Bi'Cause has led the celebrations Celebrate Bisexuality Day on September 23.

In 2015, Bi'Cause began working with Toulouse-based Bisexual advocacy group Être bi ou ne pas être bi (To bi or not to bi), one of the very few other bisexuality rights groups in the country.

On its twentieth anniversary, Bi'Cause expanded its areas of advocacy to include pansexual people. They also rejoined the Assault and Discrimination Support Network (RAVAD), an organisation dedicated to providing assistance to individuals of the LGBTQ+ community who have faced discrimination and violence.

== Activities ==
=== Publications ===
From 1997 until 2008, Bi'Cause distributed the Bi'Cause and later Bi'Cause News newsletter. The publication was transformed into a monthly online newsletter called Le Bi'llet. In 2017, its name was lengthened into Bi'llet + Pan'carte to represent the organisation's move to represent pansexuals.

In 2021, for Pansexual Visibility Day on May 24, they produced the film, along with Inter-LGBT, Pan : pas une mode (Pan: not a fashion), directed by Dylan El Kara. The film looks at the stereotypes, prejudices and discrimination surrounding pansexuality.

They have launched two online surveys on Biphobia in collaboration with SOS Homophobie, MAG jeunes gais, lesbiennes, bi et trans and ACT UP-Paris. The first from 2012 until 2015. The second from 2017 until 2021.

== Events ==
Bi'Cause often hosts discussion groups and workshops. They also have scheduled debates and meetings with specific themes or people.
