= Beit Haverim =

French organization for LGBTQ Jews

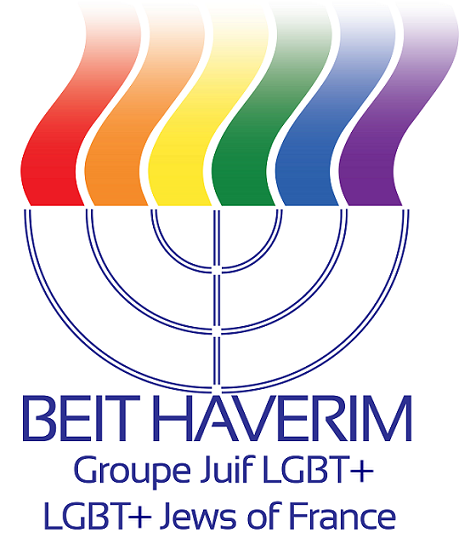
- Logo of Beit Haverim
- Established: 1977; 49 years ago
- Type: Nonprofit
- Legal status: Association loi de 1901
- Purpose: Welcoming LGBT Jews in France
- Headquarters: 5 rue Fénelon
- Location: Paris, France
- Coordinates: 48.8785°N 2.3511°E
- Co-President: Joane C.; Stevens L.
- Affiliations: Centre LGBT Paris-Île-de-France; Inter-LGBT; Les Oubliés de la Mémoire; World Congress of GLBT Jews; Maison des Associations du 10e arrondissement de Paris
- Website: www.beit-haverim.com

Beit Haverim (Hebrew: בית חברים, lit. 'House of Friends') is a French nonprofit organization for LGBTQ Jews.

== History ==
Founded in 1977 by a handful of Ashkenazi Jews, it received help and support from Pastor Joseph Doucé. Since then it has become one of the oldest and most important associations in the French LGBT community . It is among the founders of Inter-LGBT, an umbrella organization for LGBT groups in France. The association is open to all and all are welcome in a spirit of friendship, tolerance and diversity.

In 2008, the organization opened its headquarters at 5 rue Fénelon, in Paris' 10th arrondissement.

In 2017, the organization celebrated its 40th anniversary by releasing a book. The organization reached out to several French Rabbis to participate, and only Michaël Azoulay accepted. The objective of the book was to present an analysis of the relationship between Homosexuality and Judaism. In April 2017, the organization joined the organization Les «Oublié.es» to remember both the Persecution of homosexuals in Nazi Germany and The Holocaust in France.

== Work ==
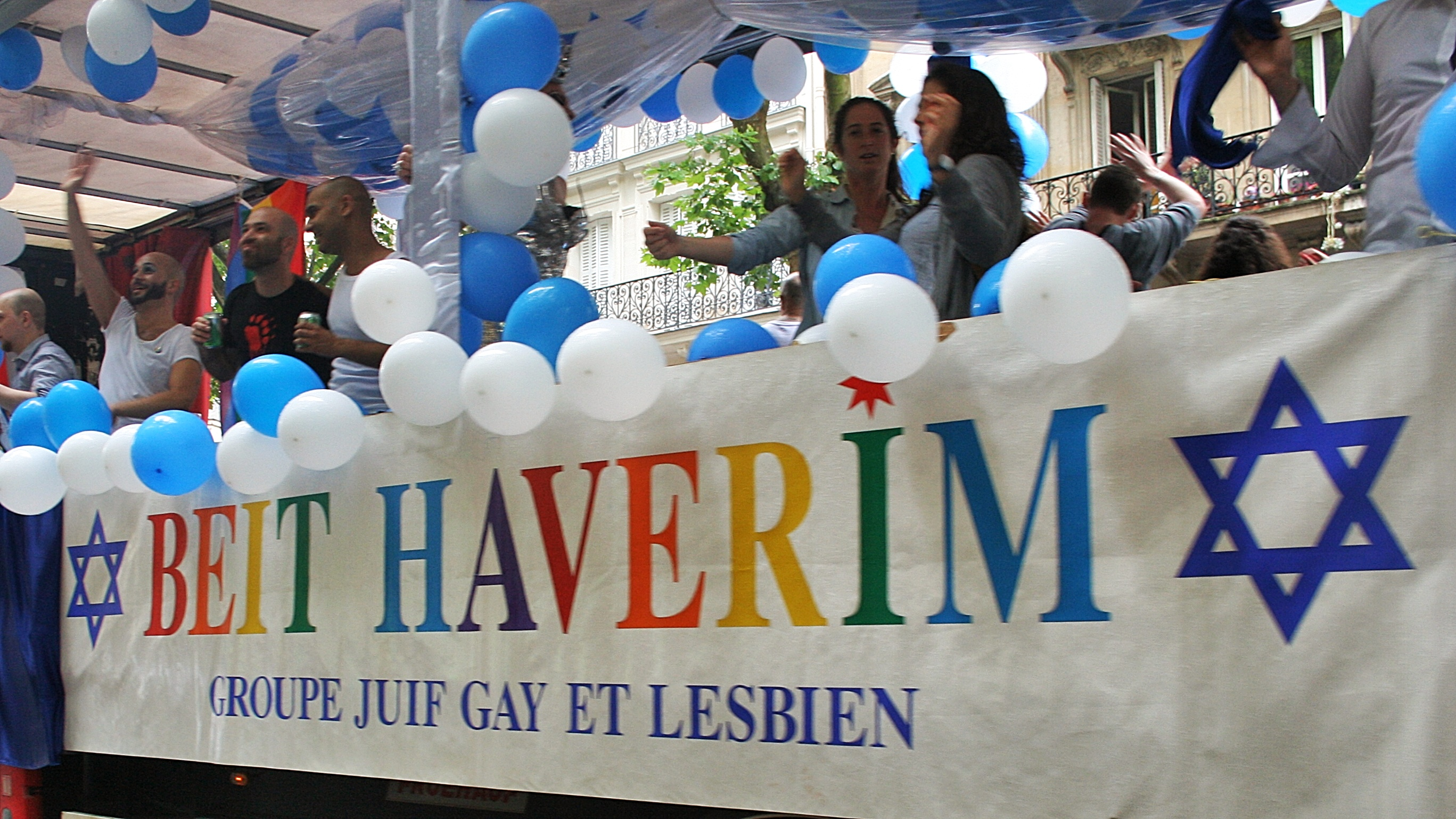
Beit Haverim float at a 2014 Paris Pride

The organization supports its members in accepting their dual identities as Jewish and LGBT and fights to promote the inclusion of LGBT Jews in the larger French Jewish community.

In Paris, Lyon, Montpellier, and Marseille, Beit Haverim organizes diverse activities, including events with Jewish and/or LGBT personalities, discussion forums, as well as a number of social events. The organization is nonpolitical and welcomes people from all political, religious and sexual orientations.

Beit Haverim is a member of the Board of Directors for the Centre LGBT of Paris, a founding member of 'Inter-LGBT, member of RAVAD (the Support Network for Victims of Assault and Discrimination) and the World Congress of Gay Lesbian Bisexual and Transgender Jewish Organisations.
