= Gay, Lesbian, Bisexual, Transsexual and Straight Party / We Are All Equal =

Gay, Lesbian, Bisexual, Transsexual and Straight Party / We Are All Equal Partido Gay, Lésbico, Bisexual, Transexual y Heterosexual / Todos Somos Iguales
- Abbreviation: GLBTH/TSI
- President: Pere Mir Tarrasón
- Vice President: Sergio Pascual Carmona
- Founded: April 29, 2009
- Headquarters: C/ Valleta nº 2 - D, Bajos 5ª, Hospitalet de Llobregat
- Ideology: LGBT rights Disability rights
- Political position: Centre

Gay, Lesbian, Bisexual, Transsexual and Straight Party / We Are All Equal (Spanish: Partido Gay, Lésbico, Bisexual, Transexual y Heterosexual / Todos Somos Iguales, GLBTH/TSI) was a Spanish LGBT rights political party founded in 2009.

== History ==
The party was founded in 2009 by members of the Civil Liberties Party who split from the party over its exclusion of heterosexual people. The activists, led by Pere Mir Tarrasón, registered the party in April 2009. The party had delegations around Spain, but was based in the city of Hospitalet de Llobregat in Catalonia.

The party wished to gather the necessary signatures to present candidacies for the 2009 European Parliament election but failed to obtain the 15,000 signatures required to do so. They campaigned on spreading the sex change subsidy to all European countries.

The party competed in its first election in 2010, the Catalan regional election, running candidates in Tarragona and Girona. They collected only 498 votes and no seats.

In the 2011 Spanish general election, the GLBTH/TSI ran with the Motor and Sports Alternative (Alternativa Motor y Deportes) party, a motorist interest and sporting interest party founded in 2007. The two parties presented the "Enough is enough, Open Group of Political Parties" (Basta Ya, Agrupación Abierta de Partidos Políticos) list in Cantabria, winning 308 votes and no seats.

Since the 2011 election the party has remained inactive but it continues to be registered with the Registry of Political Parties of the Ministry of the Interior.

== See Also ==
- List of LGBT political parties
- Democratic Gay/Lesbian Party - The People's Party
- Gay Party
