= Marguerite Stern =

French polemicist (born 1990)

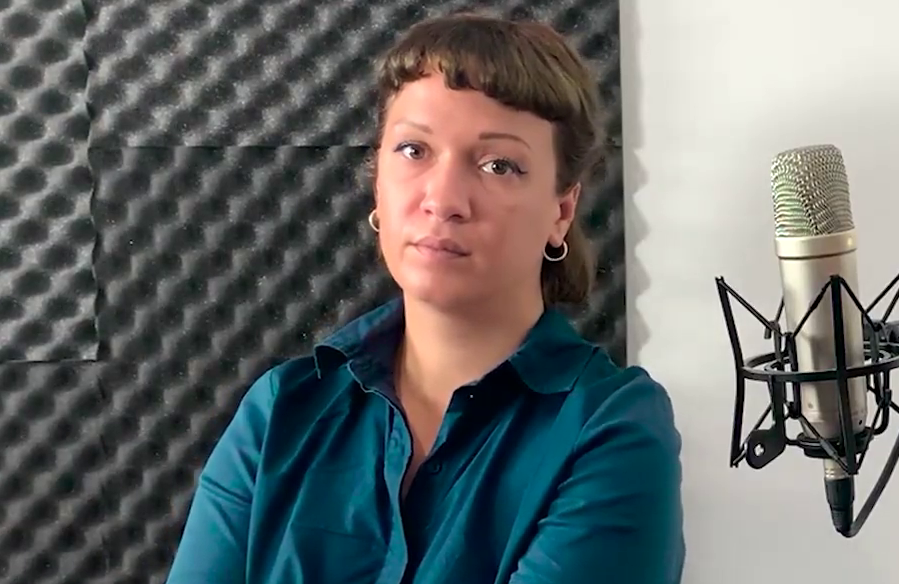
- Marguerite Stern en 2024.
- Born: Laurine de Oliveira Ferreira; November 24, 1990 (age 35); Clermont-Ferrand
- Education: Paris 8 University
- Website: www.margueritestern.com

Marguerite Stern (born November 24, 1990) is a French polemicist and activist known for her past work with Femen France and founding a collage movement against femicide. Her commentary on trans issues led peers in the collage movement to label her transphobic, and she became increasingly marginalized within it; she later affiliated with far-right political figures such as Julien Rochedy.

== Biography ==
Stern was born and raised in Auvergne; her father is a Portuguese immigrant. After graduating secondary school and receiving her baccalauréat littéraire, she left Auvergne for Paris, where she studied visual arts at Paris 8 University Vincennes-Saint-Denis. She further studied architecture in Brussels.

== Activism ==
On her return to Paris in 2012, Marguerite Stern dropped out of her arts program and began participating in activism with Femen.

=== Demonstration against the Civitas movement ===
On November 18, 2012, Stern participated in protests by Femen France against a Civitas demonstration opposing same-sex marriage and suffered violence from members of the political party. Accused of public insult towards fundamentalist Catholics, she was acquitted on November 19, 2024.

She was also accused, along with six other Femen members, of having used fire extinguishers as an "improvised weapon" with six other Femen members. She then obtained a first dismissal on November 19, 2024. She was again acquitted of the facts on October 24, 2024.

On May 29, 2013, she participated in the first Femen demonstration in an Arab country with two other activists in Tunisia, in support of Amina Sboui. They were arrested and detained for a month in a Manouba prison. On June 12, 2013, they were sentenced to 4 months and one day in prison for "violating public morality and decency".

=== In Morocco against homophobia ===
On June 2, 2015, she was part of Femen's first demonstration in Morocco, in front of the Hassan Tower in Rabat, where she kissed another activist topless. According to a press release, the action sought to "celebrate LGBT rights and denounce the injustice done to the homosexual community in Morocco". Seven hours after the protest, they were arrested, questioned for six hours, then expelled from the territory.

=== Commitment to welcoming refugees ===
From 2015 to 2016 she taught French to refugees in the Calais Jungle.

=== Feminist collages ===
In February 2019, she began posting collages which featured brief feminist slogans in public spaces across France, particularly in Paris and Marseille. Her collages are composed of black letters painted one by one on white sheets. Her first slogan was "Since I was 13, men have commented on my physical appearance in the street."

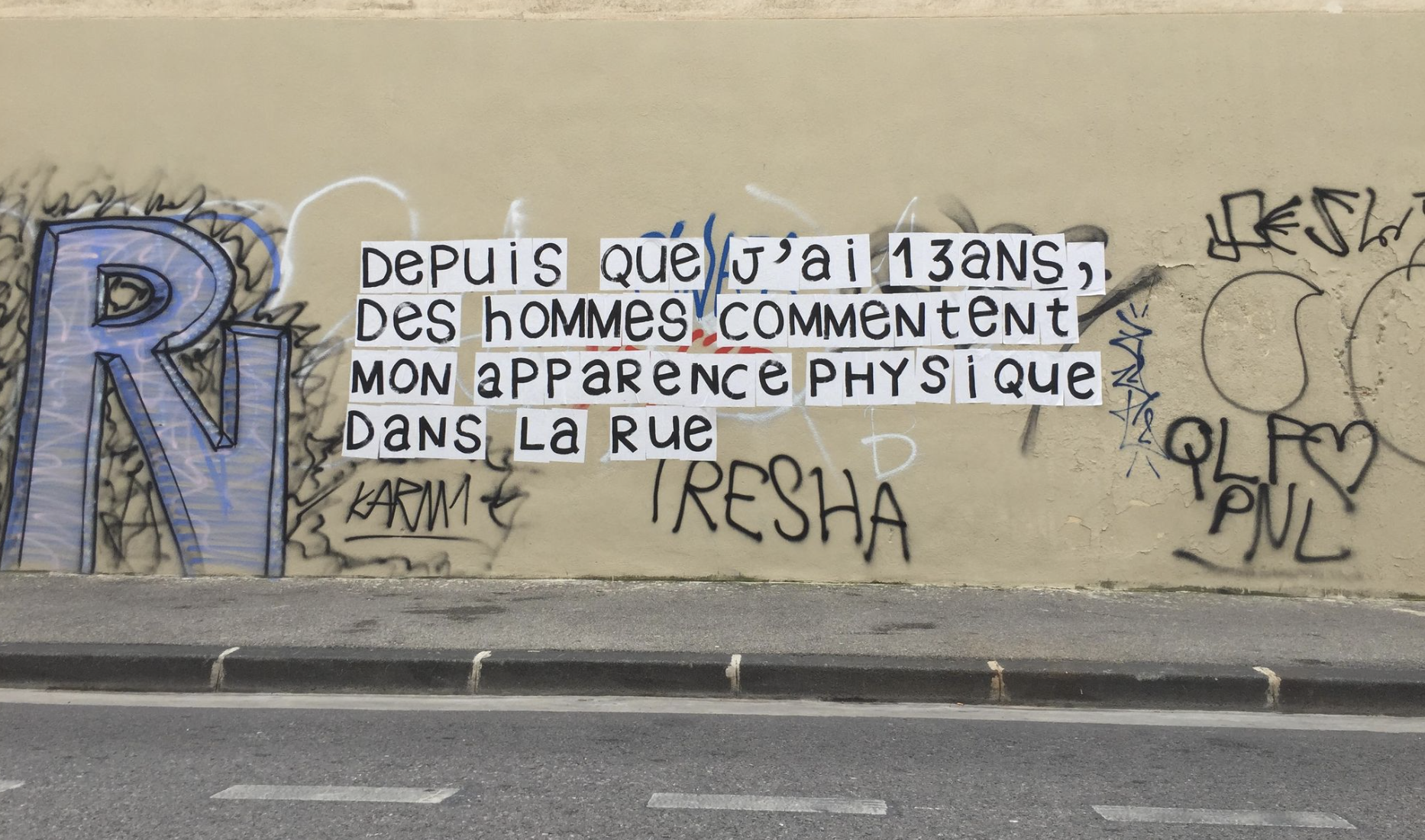
First collage using aesthetics composed of A4 sheets

On August 30, 2019, she initiated a collective national effort to post similar collages with slogans opposing femicides. She managed the operation of the Paris group and the launch of the movement on a national scale for a month, before stepping aside from leadership. She continued to post collages independently.

Collage groups formed in several French cities, and later internationally, owing to the simplicity of the mode of action and the increase in the number of femicides in France. The media, in France and abroad, expressed interest in the phenomenon. The collages aimed to raise awareness and denounce inaction by public authorities toward effectively combatting violence against women. The messages paid tribute to the victims of femicide and displayed short sentences which describe the circumstances of the murders express more general feminist ideas.

In July 2020, she opened a feminist squatting demonstration called "L'amazone" in the 12th arrondissement of Paris, a hotspot for both the collage movement and women in the arts generally. She excluded trans women from the demonstration. The demonstration was evacuated a month later.

== Privacy ==
On October 20, 2016, a day after an altercation with men from her neighborhood, a 9mm bullet hit the window of her Marseille apartment in the middle of the night.

== Positions and controversies ==
=== Positions on Islamic veiling practices ===
Representing a "universalist" feminism, as opposed to "essentialist" feminism, she rejects the idea the Islamic veiling practices are a matter of free will.

=== Positions on trans identity, accusations of transphobia and connections to the far-right ===
On January 22, 2020, after a collage was posted in the city of Montpellier calling for the inclusion of trans women in the feminist movement with the slogan "sisters not cisTERF" (a pun on "cis", i.e. not trans, and "TERF", meaning "transgender-exclusionary radical feminist"), she commented she felt trans activism had become too important in the collage movement and within feminism on Twitter. She stated in particular that being a woman is a question of biology and that the activism of trans women was insulting and reduced women to a set of patriarchal stereotypes such as makeup and clothes. She denied trans women's womanhood, stating: "Throughout time, men have tried to silence women by silencing their revolts. Today, they do it from the inside by infiltrating our struggles". She refuses trans-inclusive language such as "people with vulvas". Her positions have led to her being considered a "TERF" by intersectional feminists.

Following these statements, the Instagram account Collages Féminicides Paris distanced itself from her comments: "Discrimination has always been condemned […]. We're talking about the exclusion of a part of women from the struggle; transphobia is not a debate." She became increasingly marginalized in the collage movement, months after leaving its leadership. She was the subject of numerous insults on social networks, so much so that the collective reacted and specified that it repudiates any "killing rhetoric".

In February 2020, Marguerite Stern, alongside Christine Delphy and Fatiha Agag-Boudjahlat, co-signed a column written by Pauline Arrighi entitled "Trans: suffit-il de s'autoproclamer femme pour pouvoir exiger d'être considéré comme telle?" ("Trans: is it enough to proclaim oneself a woman to be able to demand to be considered as such"). This column was initially published in HuffPost and later taken town the editorial staff, who described it as transphobic. It was later republished by Marianne. On February 26, 2020, several personalities and associations signed two columns in Libération entitled "Féminisme: le débat sur la place des femmes trans n'a pas lieu d'être" ("Feminism: the debate on the place of trans women has no place") and "À toi ma sœur, mon frère, mon adelphe" ("To you my sister, my brother, my sibling"). These opposed pieces crystallized the ongoing dissension within the collage movement over transgender rights. Marguerite Stern was harassed for her positions, and received death threats, which led to psychiatric hospitalization for generalized anxiety disorder.

In September 2021, seven authors responded to these views by withdrawing from a feminist book fair due to Stern and fellow activist Dora Moutot's participation.

In August 2022, she co-signed with Dora Moutot a column published in Marianne addressed to Élisabeth Borne, in which they opposed a Planned Parenthood poster with a pregnant transgender man, stating that "it uses vocabulary used by transactivists". According to Mediapart, the text was "mostly relayed by far-right activists, press outlets or personalities".

Dora Moutot and Marguerite Stern later launched "femellism", a movement which according to Arrêt sur images is rejected by many feminists "for its transphobia". According to its report, the movement adheres to conspiracy theories about the "funding of the trans lobby" and remains close to ultraconservative and far-right ideology. The two activists rejected these accusations and characterized femellism as a fight "against the oppressions that women suffer because of their sex". Libération criticizes the two activists for ideological connections and common obsessions with the activists of La Manif pour tous and the far-right. Marguerite Stern later lent her support to a well-known figure of the far-right, Julien Rochedy, a masculinist and former national director of National Rally's youth group between 2012 and 2014. In September 2024, she gave a lecture at the Institut de sciences sociales économiques et politiques, a group founded by Marion Maréchal, a far-right political figure.

Dora Moutot and Marguerite Stern were welcomed shortly after by LREM deputies Caroline Yadan and Aurore Bergé, which led to protests from two other LREM elected officials, Pierre Karleskind and Raphaël Gérard, the latter denouncing Carloine Yadan's "vocabulary which makes echo of the hateful speeches heard in Poland or Hungary". Shortly after this meeting Aurore Bergé tabled an amendment to remove language inclusive of trans men from a bill designed to enshrine access to abortion.

Interviewed in September 2022 by Libération, Marguerite Stern denied being transphobic, stating: "I am not transphobic because I say that a trans woman is a man and I am not fighting trans people but trans ideology. In the same way that I am not Islamophobic because I say that Islam is shit, nor anti-Semitic because I say that the Jewish religion is shit, nor 'communistophobic' because I say that communism is shit".

Due to threats, she canceled a visit to Nantes scheduled for April 2023 for the annual conference organized by Comité Laïcité République Pays de la Loire at the Château des ducs de Bretagne, where she was due to hold a conference entitled "Cinq ans après #MeToo, où en est le féminisme?" ("Five years after #MeToo, where is feminism?"). Organizers opted to postpone and relocate the conference to Paris, maintaining her attendance.

On 19 November 2024, Marguerite Stern opposed the LFI amendment proposing that a transgender woman can be incarcerated in a women's prison.

==== Controversy surrounding the book Transmania ====
In April 2024, the Paris town hall opposed the promotion on billboards of a book she wrote with Dora Moutot, Transmania. According to the First Deputy Mayor, Emmanuel Grégoire, the book propagates "hate speech" towards transgender people, which "goes against the values held by the City of Paris". After JCDecaux withdrew its advertisements for the book, Dora Moutot denounced this as "an act of censorship" .

On April 20, 2024, SOS Homophobie announced that it was filing a complaint against Dora Moutot and Marguerite Stern for their book Transmania, the association denouncing "hatred against trans people".

A conference on books at the Paris-Panthéon-Assas university at the initiative of the Student Cockade was announced for May 6, 2024, provoking controversy, with left-wing student associations and the communist senator of Paris Ian Brossat requesting its cancellation. It was finally held under police protection in an annex center, while a counter-demonstration of 150 people took place across from it.

She participated in the 2024 summer course of the far-right Reconquête party led by Éric Zemmour.

=== Rejection of feminism ===
In July 2023, she expressed her rejection of feminism due to developments in feminist struggles which she considers negative. She now defines herself simply as "female" and has affiliated herself with far-right masculinist activist Julien Rochedy, whose positions she says she shares. At the end of October 2024, she apologized to the Catholic Church for her past actions during protests against the Church's opposition to same-sex marriage and said she had evolved after "investigating transgender ideology" and its "harmful consequences".

== Works ==
=== Essays ===
- FEMEN, Manifeste FEMEN, éditions Utopia, 2014 ISBN 978-2919160174.
- Héroïnes de la rue, Manifeste pour un féminisme de combat, éditions Michel Lafon, 2020 ISBN 978-2749943961.
- avec Dora Moutot, Transmania, Magnus, 2024.

=== Podcasts ===
- Conversations avec Marie, March 2019
- Héroïnes de la rue, April 2019
- Le dernier homme, April 2021
- Écoutez les survivantes, June 2021
- Ma fortune, March 2022
- Au peuple des femmes, May 2022
