= LGBTQ rights in France =

- Location of Metropolitan France (dark green) – in Europe (light green & dark grey) – in the European Union (light green) – [Legend]
- Legal status: Homosexuality decriminalized since 1791, age of consent (re)equalised in 1982
- Gender identity: Transgender people allowed to change legal gender without surgery
- Military: LGBT people allowed to serve openly
- Discrimination protections: Sexual orientation and gender identity protections (see below)

Family rights
- Recognition of relationships: Civil solidarity pact since 1999; Same-sex marriage since 2013
- Adoption: Full adoption rights since 2013

Lesbian, gay, bisexual, transgender, and queer (LGBTQ) rights in France are some of the most progressive by world standards. Although same-sex sexual activity was a capital crime that often resulted in the death penalty during the ancien régime, all sodomy laws were repealed in 1791 during the French Revolution. However, a lesser-known indecent exposure law that often targeted LGBTQ people was introduced in 1960, before being repealed in 1980.

The age of consent for same-sex sexual activity was altered more than once before being equalised in 1982 under President François Mitterrand. After granting same-sex couples domestic partnership benefits known as the civil solidarity pact in 1999, France became the thirteenth country in the world to legalise same-sex marriage in 2013. Laws prohibiting discrimination on the basis of sexual orientation and gender identity were enacted in 1985 and 2012, respectively. In 2010, France became the first country in the world to declassify gender dysphoria as a mental illness. Additionally, since 2017, transgender people have been allowed to change their legal gender without undergoing surgery or receiving any medical diagnosis.

France has frequently been named one of the most gay-friendly countries in the world. Recent polls have indicated that a majority of the French people support same-sex marriage and in 2013, another poll indicated that 77% of the French population believed homosexuality should be accepted by society, one of the highest in the 39 countries polled. During his tenure (January to September 2024), Gabriel Attal, the country's prime minister from January to September 2024, was one of the few openly gay heads of government in the world. Paris has been named by many publications as one of the most gay-friendly cities in the world, with a thriving LGBTQ community and nightlife in Le Marais, Quartier Pigalle and Bois de Boulogne.

== Law regarding same-sex sexual activity ==
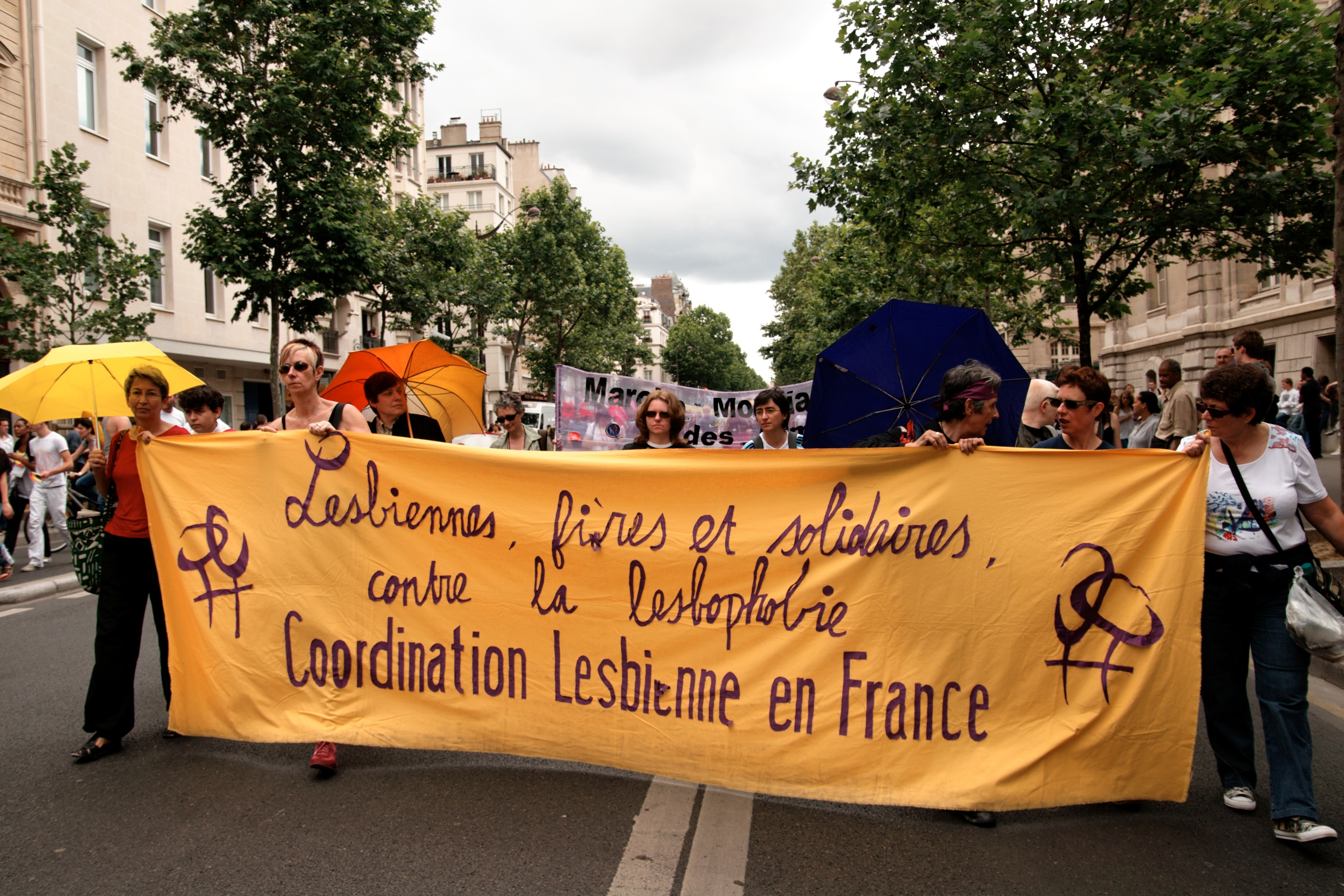
Gay Pride, Paris, 2008

=== Sodomy laws ===
Before the French Revolution, sodomy was a serious crime. Same-sex sexual acts resulted in castration on the first offense, dismemberment on the second, and burning on the third. Lesbian behavior was punished with specific mutilations for the first two offenses and burning on the third as well. Jean Diot and Bruno Lenoir were the last gay people burned to death on 6 July 1750. The first French Revolution decriminalised homosexuality when the Penal Code of 1791 made no mention of same-sex relations in private. This policy on private sexual conduct was retained in the Penal Code of 1810 and followed in nations and French colonies that adopted the Code. Still, homosexuality and cross-dressing were widely seen as being immoral, and LGBTQ people were still subjected to legal harassment under various laws concerning public morality and order. Some LGBTQ people from the regions of Alsace and Lorraine, which were annexed by Nazi Germany in 1940, were persecuted and interned in concentration camps. LGBTQ people were also persecuted under the Vichy Regime, despite there being no laws criminalizing homosexuality.

=== Higher age of consent ===
An age of consent was introduced on 28 April 1832. It was fixed to 11 years for both sexes and later raised to 13 years in 1863. On 6 August 1942, the Vichy Government introduced a discriminative law in the Penal Code: article 334 (moved to article 331 on 8 February 1945 by the Provisional Government of the French Republic) which increased the age of consent to 21 for homosexual relations and 15 for heterosexual ones. The age of 21 was then lowered to 18 in 1974, which had become the age of legal majority. This law remained valid until 4 August 1982, when it was repealed under President François Mitterrand to equalise the age of consent at 15 years of age, despite the vocal opposition of Jean Foyer in the French National Assembly.

=== Indecent exposure ===
A less known discriminative law was adopted in 1960, inserting into the Penal Code (article 330, 2nd alinea) a clause that doubled the penalty for indecent exposure for homosexual activity. This ordonnance was intended to repress pimping. The clause against homosexuality was adopted due to a wish of Parliament, as follows:

This ordonnance was adopted by the executive after it was authorised by Parliament to take legislative measures against national scourges such as alcoholism. Paul Mirguet, a Member of the National Assembly, felt that homosexuality was also a scourge, and thus proposed a sub-amendment, therefore known as the Mirguet amendment, tasking the Government to enact measures against homosexuality, which was adopted.

Article 330 alinea 2 was repealed in 1980 as part of an act redefining several sexual offenses.

=== Compensation and Article 330 ===
In March 2024, the French National Assembly (lower house) unanimously passed a bill to victims for "compensation regarding the gay men arrested under Article 330 prior to 1980". The French Senate (upper house) is yet to vote on the bill.

== Recognition of same-sex relationships ==
Civil solidarity pacts (PACS for pacte civil de solidarité), a form of registered domestic partnerships, were enacted in 1999 for both same-sex and unmarried opposite-sex couples by the Government of Lionel Jospin. Couples who enter into a PACS contract are afforded most of the legal protections, rights, and responsibilities of marriage. The right to adoption and artificial insemination are, however, denied to PACS partners (and are largely restricted to married couples). Unlike married couples, they were originally not allowed to file joint tax returns until after three years, though this was changed in 2005.

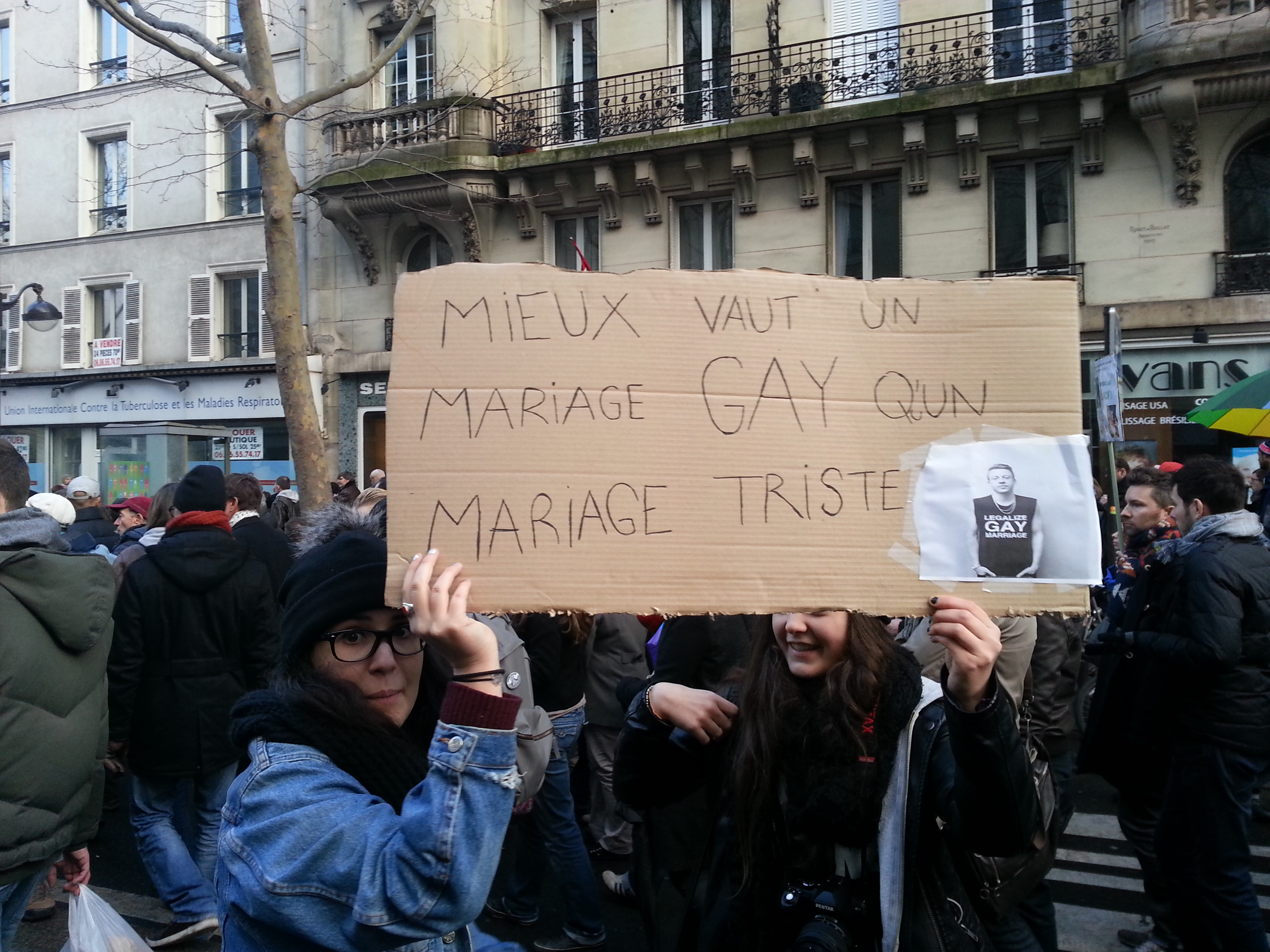
Two protesters supporting same-sex marriage, waving a sign reading Mieux vaut un mariage gay qu'un mariage triste ("better a gay marriage than a sad marriage"), January 2013, Paris

On 14 June 2011, the National Assembly of France voted 293–222 against legalising same-sex marriage. Deputies of the majority party Union for a Popular Movement voted mostly against the measure, while deputies of the Socialist Party mostly voted in favor. Members of the Socialist Party stated that legalisation of same-sex marriage would become a priority should they gain a majority in the 2012 elections.

On 7 May 2012, François Hollande won the election, and the Socialist Party and its coalition partners, Miscellaneous Left, Europe Ecology - The Greens and Radical Party of the Left, won a majority of seats in the National Assembly. In October, a marriage bill was introduced by the Aryault Government. On 2 February 2013, the National Assembly approved the first article of the bill, by 249 votes against 97. On 12 February 2013, the National Assembly approved the bill as a whole in a 329–229 vote and sent it to the country's Senate. The majority of the ruling Socialist Party voted in favor of the bill (only four of its members voted "no") while the majority of the opposition party UMP voted against it (only two of its members voted "yes").

On 4 April 2013, the Senate started the debate on the bill and five days later approved its first article in a 179–157 vote. On 12 April, the Senate approved the bill with minor amendments, which were accepted by the National Assembly on 23 April.

A challenge to the law by the conservative UMP party was filed with the Constitutional Council following the vote. On 17 May 2013, the Council ruled that the law is constitutional. On 18 May 2013, President Francois Hollande signed the bill into law, which was officially published the next day in the Journal Officiel. The first official same-sex ceremony took place on 29 May in the city of Montpellier.

== Adoption and family planning ==
Same-sex couples have been legally able to adopt children since May 2013, when the same-sex marriage law took effect. The first joint adoption by a same-sex couple was announced on 18 October 2013.

In April 2018, the Association of Gay and Lesbian Parents reported that only four same-sex couples had been able to jointly adopt a child, and the Association of LGBT Families (ADFH) reported that "some families" were able to foster a French child and "less than ten" families were able to foster a foreign child. Between May 2013 and May 2019, 10 same-sex adoptions occurred in Paris.

Lesbian couples used to not have access to assisted reproductive technology (procréation médicalement assistée, PMA), as it would only be available to heterosexual couples. A poll in 2012 showed that 51% of the French population supported allowing lesbian couples to access it. The French Socialist Party also supports it. In June 2017, a spokesperson for French President Emmanuel Macron stated that the government intends to legislate to allow assisted reproduction for lesbian couples. This followed a report by an independent ethics panel in France which recommended that PMA law be revised to include lesbian couples and single people. In 2017, a poll indicated that 64% of the French people supported the extension of assisted reproduction to lesbian couples. In 2024, the Constitution of France was amended to include express protections for reproductive rights.

In July 2018, MP Guillaume Chiche introduced a bill to legalise assisted reproduction for lesbian couples and single women. In June 2019, Prime Minister Édouard Philippe told the National Assembly that the legislation will be examined in the Assembly from the end of September 2019. The bill was adopted in its first reading by the National Assembly on 15 October 2019 by a vote of 359–114. It passed its second reading on 31 July 2020 by 60 votes to 37 (the low turnout being due to most Assembly members having gone on summer holidays). The Senate approved the bill in first reading on 4 February 2020 by 153 votes to 143 with 45 abstentions. The proposal also foresees the state covering the cost of the assisted reproduction procedures for all women under 43 and allowing children born with donated sperm to find out their donor's identity when they reach the age of 18. The bill came into effect in September 2021.

Up until 2015, France refused to recognise surrogate children as French citizens. This left many such children in legal limbo. On 5 July 2017, the Court of Cassation ruled that a child born to a surrogate abroad can be adopted by the partner of his or her biological father. That same year, the Tribunal de grande instance de Paris granted French citizenship to twin boys born through surrogacy in Ontario, Canada, to a same-sex couple (both French citizens). However, it refused to register the children in the vital records. In May 2019, the Court of Appeal of Paris reversed certain parts of the decision, holding that the Canadian birth certificate must be recognised by the French state. In December 2019, the Court of Cassation ruled that foreign birth certificates that recognise same-sex partners must be fully recognised in France.

== Discrimination protections ==
In 1985, national legislation was enacted to prohibit sexual orientation based discrimination in employment, housing and other public and private provisions of services and goods. In July 2012, the French Parliament added "sexual identity" to the protected grounds of discrimination in French law. The phrase "sexual identity" was used synonymous with "gender identity" despite some criticism from ILGA-Europe, who nevertheless still considered it an important step. On 18 November 2016, a new law amended article 225-1 of the French Penal Code to replace "sexual identity" with "gender identity".

Chapter 2 of the Labour Code (French: Code du travail) (Note: Occitan: Còde del trabalh; Breton: Kod al labour; Corsican: Codice di u travagliu) reads as follows:

No person may be excluded from a recruitment process or from access to an internship or a period of training in a company, no employee may be sanctioned, dismissed or subject to a discriminatory measure, direct or indirect, [...], on account of origin, gender, morals, sexual orientation, gender identity, age, family situation or pregnancy, genetic characteristics, economic situation, membership or non-membership, true or supposed, to an ethnic group, nation or race, political opinions, trade union or mutualist activities, religious beliefs, physical appearance, last name, place of residence, health conditions, loss of autonomy or disability, or usage of a language other than French.

=== Discrimination in schools ===
In March 2008, Xavier Darcos, Minister of Education, announced a policy fighting against all forms of discrimination, including homophobia, in schools. It was one of 15 national priorities of education for the 2008–2009 school year. The Fédération Indépendante et Démocratique Lycéenne (FIDL; Independent and Democratic Federation of High School Students)–the first high school student union in France–has also launched campaigns against homophobia in schools and among young people.

In January 2019, the Ministry of Education launched a new campaign to tackle anti-LGBTQ bullying in schools. The campaign, called Tous égaux, tous alliés (All equal, all allied), helps students access services to report bullying, established a helpline for students and staff to use, and requires all French schools to provide guidance about LGBTQ issues. The International Day Against Homophobia (17 May) will also be a special day to promote actions of sensitisation.

In February 2019, it was reported that France uses the words "parent 1" and "parent 2" rather than "mother" and "father" on application forms to enroll children into schools. This caused widespread outrage among conservatives in France, despite both same-sex marriage and LGBTQ adoption having been legal in the country for six years.

In March 2019, Frédérique Vidal, Minister of Higher Education, announced that she wanted all higher education institutions to use transgender people's preferred names, including on student cards and exam forms.

== Hate crime laws ==
On 31 December 2004, the National Assembly approved an amendment to existing anti-discrimination legislation, making homophobic, sexist, racist, xenophobic etc. comments illegal. The maximum penalty of a €45,000 fine and/or 12 months' imprisonment has been criticised by civil liberty groups such as Reporters Without Borders as a serious infringement on free speech. But the conservative Chirac Government pointed to a rise in anti-gay violence as justification for the measure. Ironically, an MP in Chirac's own UMP party, Christian Vanneste, became the first person to be convicted under the law in January 2006 although this conviction was later cancelled by the Court of Cassation after a refused appeal.

The law of December 2004 created the Haute autorité de lutte contre les discriminations et pour l'égalité (High Authority against Discrimination and for Equality). Title 3 and articles 20 and 21 of the law amended the Law on the Freedom of the Press of 29 July 1881 to make provisions for more specific offenses including injury, defamation, insult, incitement to hatred or violence, or discrimination against a person or group of persons because of their gender, sexual orientation or disability. When a physical assault or murder is motivated by the sexual orientation of the victim, the law increases the penalties that are normally given.

In October 2018, after a rise in a series of homophobic attacks, President Emmanuel Macron denounced the homophobic violence as being "unworthy of France", announcing future "concrete measures". He tweeted: "Homophobic violence must be a concern for our entire society. They are unworthy of France. Concrete measures will be announced but they [cannot] replace humanity and tolerance which are at the heart of our culture", without specifying the content of these future measures.

A report released on 16 May 2020, right before the International Day Against Homophobia, Transphobia and Biphobia, showed that homophobic and transphobic attacks and insults rose by 36% in 2019. Police identified around 1,870 victims of transphobic and homophobic attacks. In 2018, the figures were around 1,380.

== Transgender rights ==
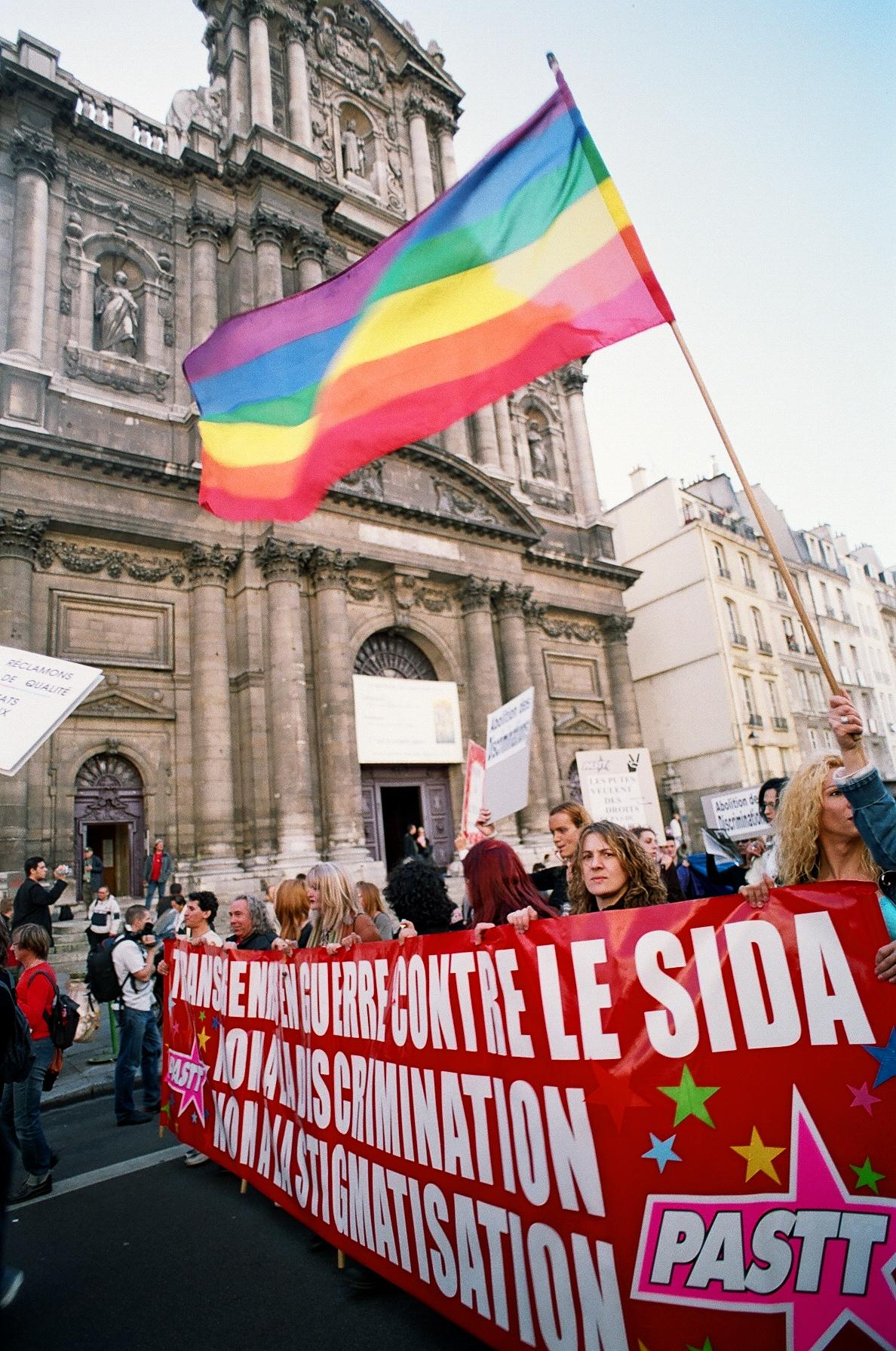
Transgender rights protest, Paris, 2005

1962 saw the first marriage involving a transgender person recognised by the French government between cabaret star Coccinelle and journalist Francis Paul Bonnet. Coccinelle had legally changed her gender in 1959 with the help of lawyer Robert Badinter. However, the French legislature then banned legal gender change for people for many decades, even if they had undergone medical and surgical transition, until a 1992 case, B. vs France at the European Court of Human Rights changed this.

In 1979, France legalised gender affirmative surgery taking place within the country. Before this it could only be accessed abroad.

In 2010, France removed gender identity disorder as a diagnosis by decree, but according to French transgender rights organizations, beyond the impact of the announcement itself, nothing changed. Transsexualism is part of the ALD 31 (fr) and treatment is funded by Sécurité Sociale.

Discrimination on the basis of "sexual identity" has been banned since 2012. In 2016, the term "sexual identity" was replaced by "gender identity".

On 6 November 2015, a bill to allow transgender people to legally change their gender without the need for sex reassignment surgery and forced sterilisation was approved by the French Senate. On 24 May 2016, the National Assembly approved the bill. MP Pascale Crozon, who introduced the bill, reminded MPs before the vote about the long, uncertain and humiliating procedures by which transgender people must go through to change their gender on vital records. Due to differing texts, a joint session was established. On 12 July 2016, the National Assembly approved a modified version of the bill which maintained the provisions outlawing psychiatrist certificates and proofs of sex reassignment surgery, while also dropping the original bill's provision of allowing self-certification of gender. On 28 September, the French Senate discussed the bill. The National Assembly then met on 12 October in a plenary session to approve the bill once more and rejected amendments proposed by the Senate which would have required proof of medical treatment. On 17 November, the Constitutional Council ruled that the bill is constitutional. It was signed by the President on 18 November 2016, published in the Journal Officiel the next day, and took effect on 1 January 2017. While no longer requiring proof of surgery or medical interventions, transgender people need to go before a court in order to have their gender marker changed. Changing the first name can be also done by registry office.

In 2017, transphobia became a cause of aggravation for all crimes that can be punished by prison.

In 2022, a court of appeal ruled that a transgender woman should be considered the mother of the child she conceived with her partner before her sex change.

=== Healthcare ===
A report published in 2022 by ILGA-Europe found significant issues with the provision of gender affirming healthcare in France, including lack of self-determination, extended waiting times, and inequitable access depending on location. The report recommended implementing a system based on informed consent and self determination.

The French Académie Nationale de Médecine, or National Academy of Medicine, has characterized the rise in trans people seeking treatment as an "epidemic-like phenomenon", and a "primarily social problem", and has advised extreme caution on allowing access to such treatments. This change to the guidelines has not changed actual practice.

In March 2024, senators from the centre-right Republican Party commissioned The Little Mermaid Observatory, a group opposed to all forms of gender transition for minors, to produce a report on youth gender affirming care. The report criticized gender affirming care as a 'health scandal', and youth transness as a 'social contagion'; and was subsequently disputed by a number of doctors and advocates. Following the report, legislation was introduced to ban medical transition under the age of 18, leading to large scale protests across the country. The bill was passed by the Senate in May 2024, but is unlikely to be passed by the National Assembly and is opposed by the ruling Macron government. The bill has been read in the 16th and 17th legislatures of the National Assembly, but has not had an update since 23 July 2024.

In late 2024, the French Society of Pediatric Endocrinology and Diabetology released the country's first ever guidelines for medical care of trans youth, in which they recommended patients who have hit at least Tanner stage 2 to receive puberty blockers along with calcium and vitamin D supplements.

=== DILCRAH controversy ===
In 2022, it was revealed that the president of the scientific committee for the French Interministerial Delegation for the Fight Against Racism, Anti-Semitism, and Anti-LGBT Hatred (DILCRAH), was a member of The Little Mermaid Observatory, which had previously referred to gender affirming healthcare as "mutilation". One DILCRAH scientific committee member resigned over the controversy, while the committee president himself publicly stepped away from The Observatory.

== Intersex rights ==
Intersex people in France have some of the same rights as other people, but with significant gaps in protection from non-consensual medical interventions and protection from discrimination. In response to pressure from intersex activists and recommendations by United Nations Treaty Bodies, the Senate published an inquiry into the treatment of intersex people in February 2017. A legal challenge by Gaëtan Schmitt to obtain "neutral sex" (sexe neutre) classification was rejected by the Court of Cassation in May 2017. On 17 March 2017, the President of the Republic, François Hollande, described medical interventions to make the bodies of intersex children more typically male or female as increasingly considered to be mutilations.

== Conversion therapy ==
Conversion therapy has a negative effect on the lives of LGBTQ people, and can lead to low self-esteem, depression and suicidal ideation. The pseudoscientific practice is believed to include electroconvulsive therapy, exorcisms, starvation or, especially, talk therapy. A French survivor of a conversion therapy workshop described the practice as "psychological rape". The extent of the practice in France is unknown. The association Le Refuge estimated that around 3% to 4% of its helpline calls dealt with the issue. In summer 2019, MP Laurence Vanceunebrock-Mialon announced her intention to introduce a proposal to the National Assembly in 2020 to prohibit the usage of such 'treatments'. Punishments would be two years' imprisonment and/or a fine of 30,000 euros.

The bill to legally ban conversion therapy passed the Senate on 7 December 2020. It was concurred to by the National Assembly on 25 January 2022 and was officially published on 1 February 2022.

== Military service ==
Lesbian, gay, bisexual and transgender individuals are allowed to serve openly in the French Armed Forces.

== Blood donation ==
A circulaire from the Directorate General of Health, which dates back to 20 June 1983 at the height of the HIV epidemic, banned men who have sex with men (MSM) from donating blood. However, it was recalled by a ministerial decree on 12 January 2009.

On 3 April 2015, a deputy member of the UMP party, Arnaud Richard, presented an amendment against the exclusion of MSM, which was eventually adopted later in the same month. In November 2015, Minister of Health Marisol Touraine announced that gay and bisexual men in France can donate blood after one year of abstinence from sex. This policy was implemented and went into effect on 10 July 2016. In July 2019, Minister of Health Agnès Buzyn announced that the deferral period would be reduced to four months of abstinence from 2 April 2020.

On 16 March 2022, France removed the four-month deferral period policy on gay and bi men donating blood. The new policy applies to all individuals regardless of sexual orientation.

== LGBTQ rights movement in France ==
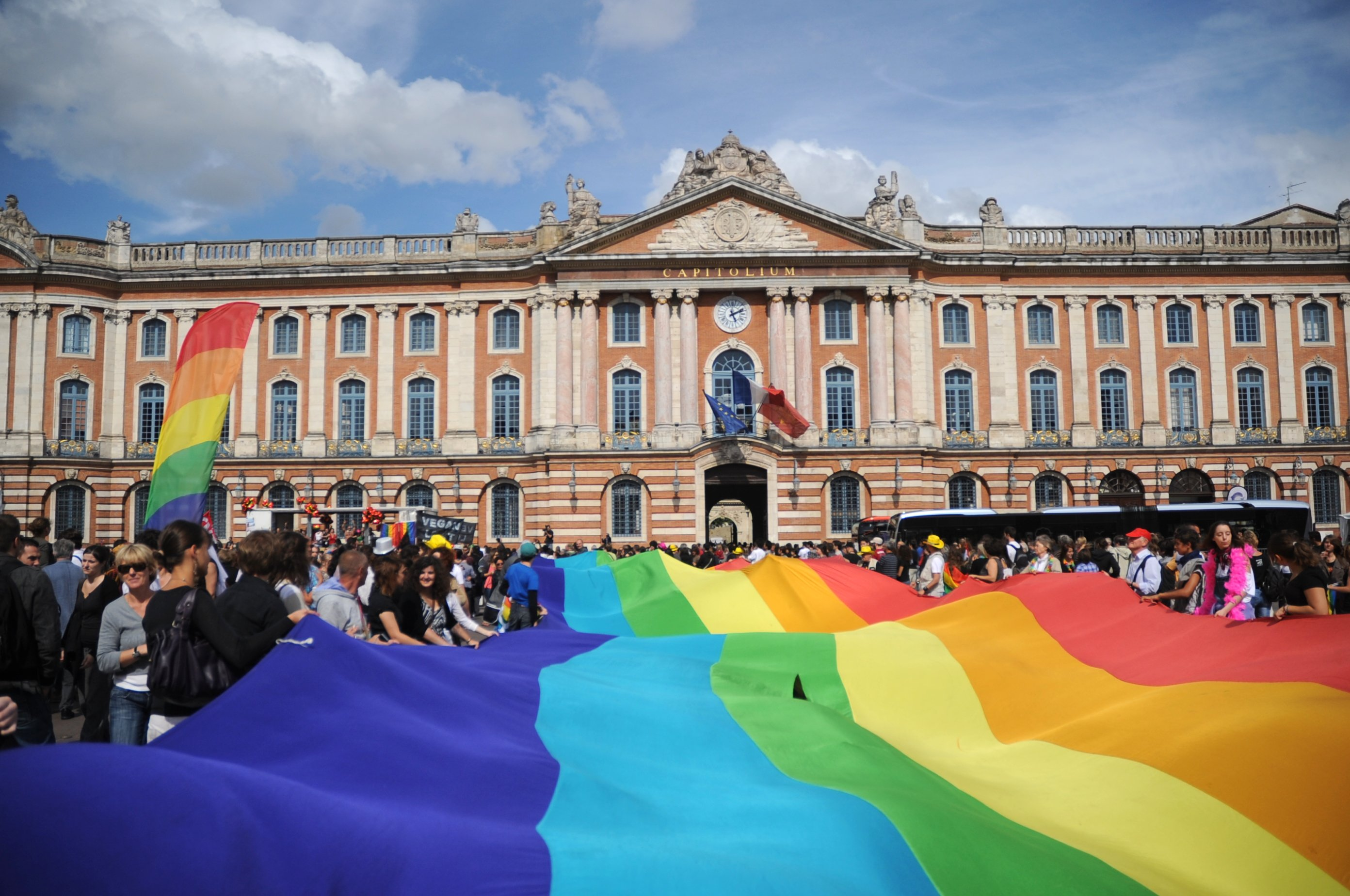
Gay pride parade in Toulouse in June 2011

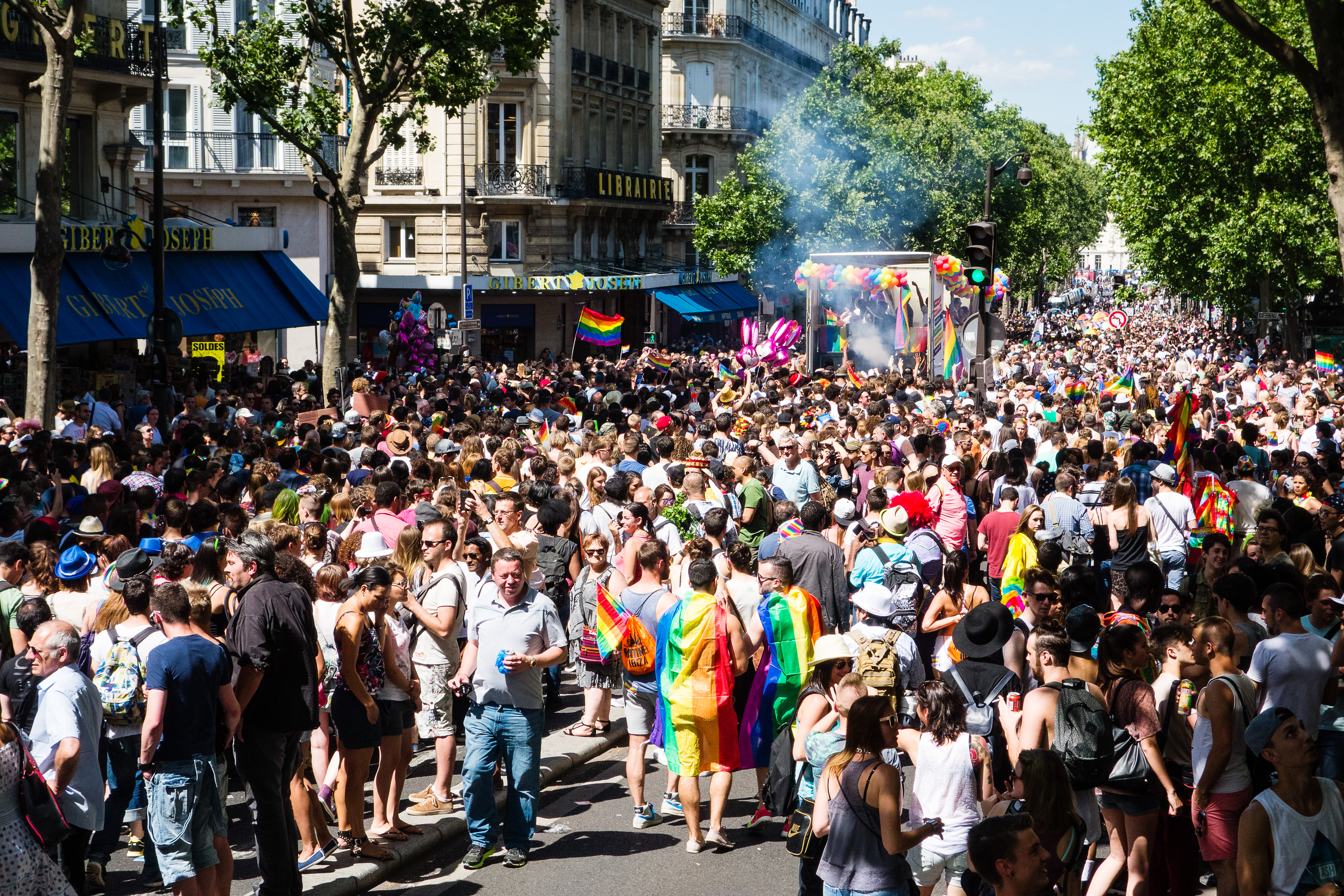
Paris Pride is held annually at the end of June, and attracts thousands of attendees.

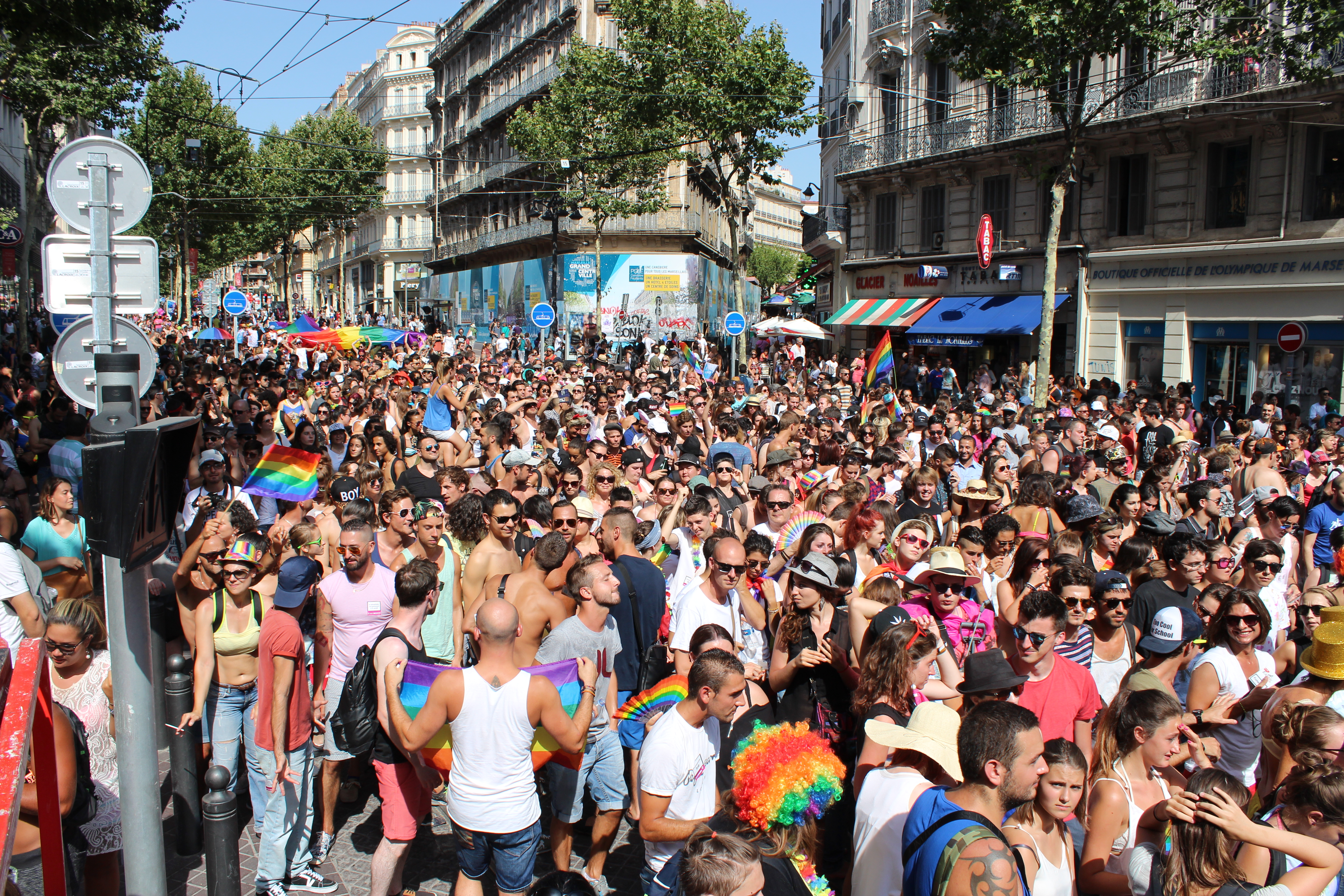
Participants at the 2015 Marseille Pride parade

LGBTQ rights organisations in France include Act Up Paris, SOS Homophobie, Arcadie, FHAR (Front homosexuel d'action révolutionnaire), Gouines rouges, GLH (Groupe de libération homosexuelle), CUARH (Comité d'urgence anti-répression homosexuelle), L'Association Trans Aide, ("Trans Aid Association", established in September 2004) and Bi'Cause.

The first pride parade in France was held in Paris on 4 April 1981 at the Place Maubert. It was organised by CUARH, and saw the participation of around 10,000 people. Paris Pride (Marche des Fiertés de Paris) is held annually in June. Its turnout has increased significantly since the 1980s, reaching around 100,000 participants in the late 1990s. Its 2019 edition saw a turnout of 500,000 people. The event is the third-largest in the city, following the Paris Marathon and the Paris Techno Parade, and includes about 60 associations, various human rights groups, political parties and several companies.

Outside Paris, pride events are also held in numerous cities around the country, including Rennes and Marseille, which held their first in 1994. Nantes, Montpellier and Toulouse organised their first pride festivals in 1995, followed by Lyon, Lille, Bordeaux, Grenoble, Cannes and Aix-en-Provence in 1996, Rouen, Biarritz, Angers and Poitiers in 2000, and Caen and Strasbourg in 2001. Others including Auxerre, Dijon, Nice and Avignon also hold pride events.

== Public opinion ==
Paris Mayor Bertrand Delanoë publicly revealed his homosexuality in 1998, before his first election in 2001.

In December 2006, an Ipsos-MORI Eurobarometer survey showed that 62% of the French public supported same-sex marriage, while 37% were opposed. 55% believed gay and lesbian couples should not have parenting rights, while 44% believed same-sex couples should be able to adopt.

In June 2011, an Ifop poll found that 63% of respondents were in favour of same-sex marriage, while 58% supported adoption rights for same-sex couples. In 2012, an Ifop poll showed that 90% of French perceived homosexuality like one way as another to live their sexuality.

A 2013 Pew Research Center opinion survey showed that 77% of the French population believed homosexuality should be accepted by society, while 22% believed it should not. Younger people were more accepting: 81% of people between 18 and 29 believed it should be accepted, 79% of people between 30 and 49 and 74% of people over 50.

In May 2015, PlanetRomeo, an LGBTQ social network, published its first Gay Happiness Index (GHI). Gay men from over 120 countries were asked about how they feel about society's view on homosexuality, how do they experience the way they are treated by other people and how satisfied are they with their lives. France was ranked 21st, just above South Africa and below Australia, with a GHI score of 63.

A 2017 Pew Research Center poll found that 73% of French people were in favour of same-sex marriage, while 23% were opposed. The 2019 Eurobarometer found that 79% of French respondents thought same-sex marriage should be allowed throughout Europe, 15% were against. Additionally, 85% believed gay, lesbian and bisexual people should enjoy the same rights as heterosexual people.

The 2023 Eurobarometer found that 79% of French people thought same-sex marriage should be allowed throughout Europe, and 84% agreed that "there is nothing wrong in a sexual relationship between two persons of the same sex".

== Overseas departments and territories ==
Same-sex marriage is legal in all of France's overseas departments and territories. Despite this, acceptance of gay and queer sexuality and same-sex relationships tends to be lower than in metropolitan France, as residents are in general more religious, and religion plays a bigger role in public life. Many of these societies are very family and tribe-oriented where family honor is highly regarded. In some of these territories, gay identity and sexuality is occasionally perceived as "foreign" and "practiced only by the white population." The first same-sex marriages in Saint Martin and French Polynesia caused public demonstrations against such marriages. Ignorance about queerness can lead to violence and hatred, or on the other hand curiosity. A 2014 study showed that about 20% of overseas residents saw homosexuality as a sexuality like any other, compared to 77% in metropolitan France. Nevertheless, the 2013 same-sex marriage law has resulted in increased discussion about the previously taboo and neglected topic. LGBTQ people have gained notable visibility since 2013.

Of the 27 overseas deputies in the French Parliament, 11 (2 from Mayotte, 3 from Réunion, 1 from French Guiana, 1 from Guadeloupe, 1 from Martinique, 2 from New Caledonia and 1 from Saint Pierre and Miquelon) voted in favor of same-sex marriage, 11 (2 from Guadeloupe, 3 from Martinique, 3 from French Polynesia, 2 from Réunion and 1 from Saint Martin and Saint Barthélemy) voted against, 1 (from French Guiana) abstained and 3 (1 each from Réunion, Guadeloupe and Wallis and Futuna) were not present during the vote.

After the Caribbean Netherlands, the French departments of Guadeloupe and Martinique and the overseas collectivities of Saint Martin and Saint Barthélemy are the second group of Caribbean islands to perform same-sex weddings.

The group Let's go (French Creole: An Nou Allé) is an LGBTQ organization active in the French Caribbean. Other groups include AIDES Territoire Martinique, KAP Caraïbe, Tjenbé Rèd Prévention and SAFE SXM (originally from Sint Maarten). Guadeloupe, Martinique, Saint Martin and Saint Barthélemy are famous internationally for their beaches and tourist attractions, which include gay bars, discos, saunas and beaches. The first "Caribbean Gay Pride" was held in the Martinique city of Le Carbet in June 2017. Regarded as successful, the event was attended by a few thousand people and included a beach party and musical dances. In addition, Saint Barthélemy's reputation as an international celebrity tourist destination has resulted in a more open and relaxed social climate for LGBTQ people than the other French Caribbean territories.

LGBTQ people in New Caledonia are widely accepted, and enjoy a large nightlife and dating scene. This is much more notable in the South Province than the Kanak-majority North Province or the Loyalty Islands. According to a 2008 survey, 65% of boys and 77% of girls in New Caledonia agreed with the statement "homosexuals are people like everybody else". However, the Kanak people reported a lower acceptance. In 2006, Lifou Island proposed a "family code", which sought to ban homosexuality and foresee punishments of eviction or lynching for LGBTQ people. The proposal was not approved.

Similarly, Réunion is known for being welcoming to LGBTQ people and has been described as a "gay-friendly haven in Africa". In 2007, the local tourism authorities launched a "gay-welcoming" charter in tour operators, hotels, bars and restaurants. There are famous gay beaches in Saint-Leu and L'Étang-Salé. The association LGBTQ Réunion organised the island's first pride parade in October 2012. Mayotte, on the other hand, is overwhelmingly Muslim and possesses a strong Arab-Bantu culture. This heavily influences public perception of the LGBTQ community, as there have been frequent reports of family rejections, harassment and discrimination on the island. Homosexuality is typically a taboo topic among the Mahorais, and many LGBTQ people have chosen to move to neighbouring Réunion or to metropolitan France. Nevertheless, the first same-sex marriage in Mayotte, the first in a majoritarily Muslim jurisdiction, was performed in September 2013 with little fanfare. Mayotte has a long-standing tradition of sarambavis, which in Shimaore refers to men who choose the follow "the law of women", and thus dress, act and behave as women and partake in traditional female activities. In recent years, the term has been used as an insult towards LGBTQ people.

The gay scene is more limited in French Guiana, though local LGBTQ people have reported a "growing sense of acceptance", which many attribute to French Guiana's closely knit families and communities. Homosexuality tends to be more taboo among the Amerindian and Bushinengue people, where the pressure to conform and to marry a heterosexual partner is very strong. Family and tribal honour are highly regarded in these cultures, and those who "bring shame to their families" are typically ostracised.

While French Polynesia tends to be more socially conservative, it has become more accepting and tolerant of LGBTQ people in recent years. In 2009, the first LGBTQ organization (called Cousins Cousines) was founded in the territory, and the first LGBTQ event was also held that same year. Furthermore, French Polynesian society has a long tradition of raising some boys as girls to play important domestic roles in communal life (including dancing, singing and house chores). Such individuals are known as the māhū, and are perceived by society as belonging to a third gender. This is similar to the fa'afafine of Samoa and the whakawāhine of New Zealand. Historically, the māhū would hold important positions among nobles, and unlike eunuchs were not castrated. The Tahitian term rae rae, on the other hand, refers to modern-day transsexuals who undergo medical operations to change gender. Māhū and rae rae are not to be confused, as the former is a cultural and traditional recognized Polynesian identity, while the latter encompasses contemporary transgender identity.

In Saint Pierre and Miquelon, the gay scene is very limited, due mostly to its small population. Nonetheless, homosexuality tends to be accepted and there is very little controversy surrounding the issue. In Wallis and Futuna, like in other Polynesian nations, the family holds a significant societal role. Homosexuality is usually treated with indifference, unless it adversely affects the family. Wallis and Futuna, like French Polynesia, also has a traditional third gender population: the fakafafine. The first same-sex marriage in Wallis and Futuna was performed in 2016.

== Summary table ==
Same-sex sexual activity legal	Yes (Since 1791)
Equal age of consent (15)	Yes (Since 1982)
Anti-discrimination laws in employment	Yes (Since 1985)
Anti-discrimination laws in the provision of goods and services	Yes (Since 1985)
Anti-discrimination laws in all other areas (incl. indirect discrimination, hate speech)	Yes (Since 2004)
Anti-discrimination laws concerning gender identity	Yes (Since 2012)
Same-sex marriage	Yes (Since 2013)
Recognition of same-sex unions	Yes (Since 1999)
Stepchild adoption by same-sex couples	Yes (Since 2013)
Joint adoption by same-sex couples	Yes (Since 2013)
Adoption by a single LGBTQ person	Yes
Automatic parenthood on birth certificates for children of same-sex couples	No (Since 2021 for lesbian couples that have accessed IVF, and for same-sex couples who have had access to surrogacy abroad; Not for surrogacy inside France)
LGBTQ people allowed to serve openly in the military	Yes
Right to change legal gender without surgery or sterilization	Yes (Requires a court order since 2016)
Non-binary gender recognition	No
Access to IVF for lesbian couples	Yes (Since 2021)
Conversion therapy legally banned	Yes (Since 2022)
Homosexuality declassified as an illness	Yes (Since 1981)
Commercial surrogacy for gay male couples	No (Since 1994; Surrogacy is illegal for all couples regardless of sexual orientation)
MSMs allowed to donate blood	Yes (Since 2022)

== See also ==
- Human rights in France
- Intersex rights in France
- LGBTQ history in France
- Same-sex marriage in France
- Feminism in France
- LGBTQ culture in Paris
- LGBTQ rights in Amapá § Legality of same-sex sexual activity
- LGBTQ rights in Europe
- LGBTQ rights in the European Union
