= Paris Pride =

Annual LGBT event in Paris, France

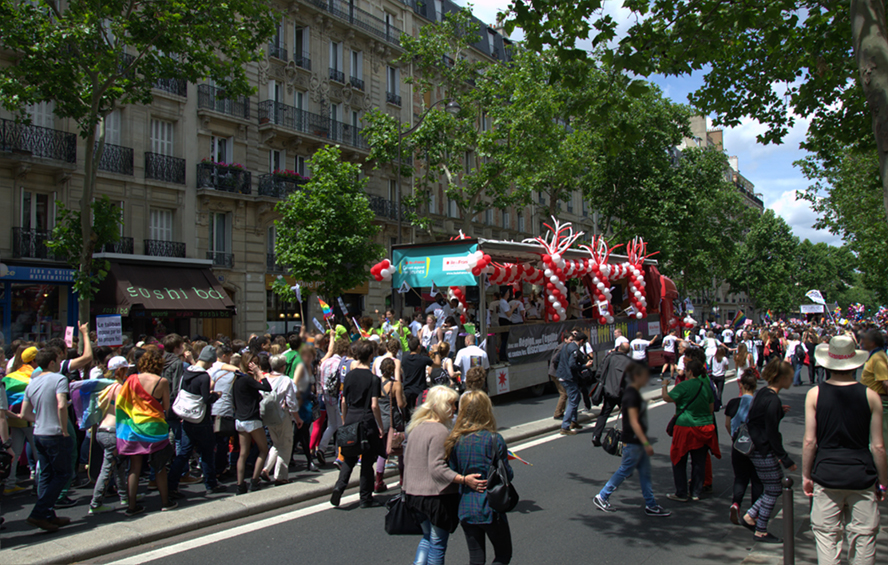
Paris Gay Pride 2013

The Paris Pride (French: Marche des fiertés LGBT de Paris) is a parade and festival held at the end of June each year in Paris, France to celebrate the lesbian, gay, bisexual, and transgender (LGBTQ) people and their allies. The parade starts each year at Tour Montparnasse and ends at Place de la Bastille. After the parade the party continues in the gay district Le Marais.

== History ==
=== Early demonstrations (1971–1976) ===
The Stonewall riots in New York in 1969 and the social upheavals of May 68 in France encouraged French LGBT people to take to the streets. The first LGBT demonstration in France took place in May 1971, shortly after the first anniversary of the Stonewall riots. Between 1971 and 1976, however, no regular annual march was organised. Instead, homosexual activists joined the traditional International Workers' Day marches on 1 May, despite opposition from some trade unions, notably the CGT. These actions were led by the Front homosexuel d'action révolutionnaire (FHAR), which became the Groupes de libération homosexuelle (GLH) in 1974.

=== First official march (1977) ===
On 25 June 1977, around 400 people marched from Place de la République to Place des Fêtes in the first explicitly LGBT pride demonstration in Paris. Organised jointly by the Mouvement de libération des femmes (MLF) and the GLH, the event was a response to anti-gay campaigns in the United States (notably Anita Bryant's "Save Our Children") and aimed to claim public visibility at a time when homosexuality remained subject to legal discrimination in France. The demonstration was predominantly female and marked the strong involvement of lesbian activists in the early French LGBT movement.

=== 1980s: Political visibility and the AIDS crisis ===
The 4 April 1981 march, organised by the Comité d'urgence anti-répression homosexuelle (CUARH), drew approximately 10,000 participants and took place just before the 1981 French presidential election. François Mitterrand, who received support from part of the LGBT community, was elected and subsequently ended several discriminatory measures: the age of consent was equalised at 15, police files on homosexuals were reduced, a specialised vice squad was disbanded, and France stopped classifying homosexuality as a mental illness in line with the World Health Organization.

The HIV/AIDS crisis profoundly affected the community from the early 1980s onward. Pride marches began incorporating demands for healthcare and against stigmatisation. Organisations such as AIDES (1984) and Act Up-Paris (1989) were created and played a major role in later marches.

=== 1990s: Growth and institutionalisation ===
Attendance increased significantly during the 1990s. In 1995 the march drew around 80,000 participants; the following year it reached 120,000. In 1997 Paris hosted EuroPride, attracting an estimated 300,000 people from across Europe. New demands emerged, including recognition of same-sex couples (leading to the PaCS in 1999) and rights for transgender and intersex people.

=== 2000s: Renaming and mass participation ===
In 2001, following a trademark dispute with a commercial organiser, the event was renamed "Marche des Fiertés LGBT" to emphasise its political and inclusive character. Attendance regularly reached several hundred thousand. In 2001 Bertrand Delanoë, newly elected mayor of Paris and the first openly gay mayor of a major European capital, participated, marking greater institutional acceptance.

=== 2010s ===
The 2013 March celebrated the legalisation of same-sex marriage earlier that year. Subsequent editions focused on extending assisted reproductive technology (PMA) to all women, combating rising LGBTphobia, and improving transgender rights. In 2017 the march marked its 40th anniversary with the slogan calling for PMA without restrictions.

=== 2020s ===
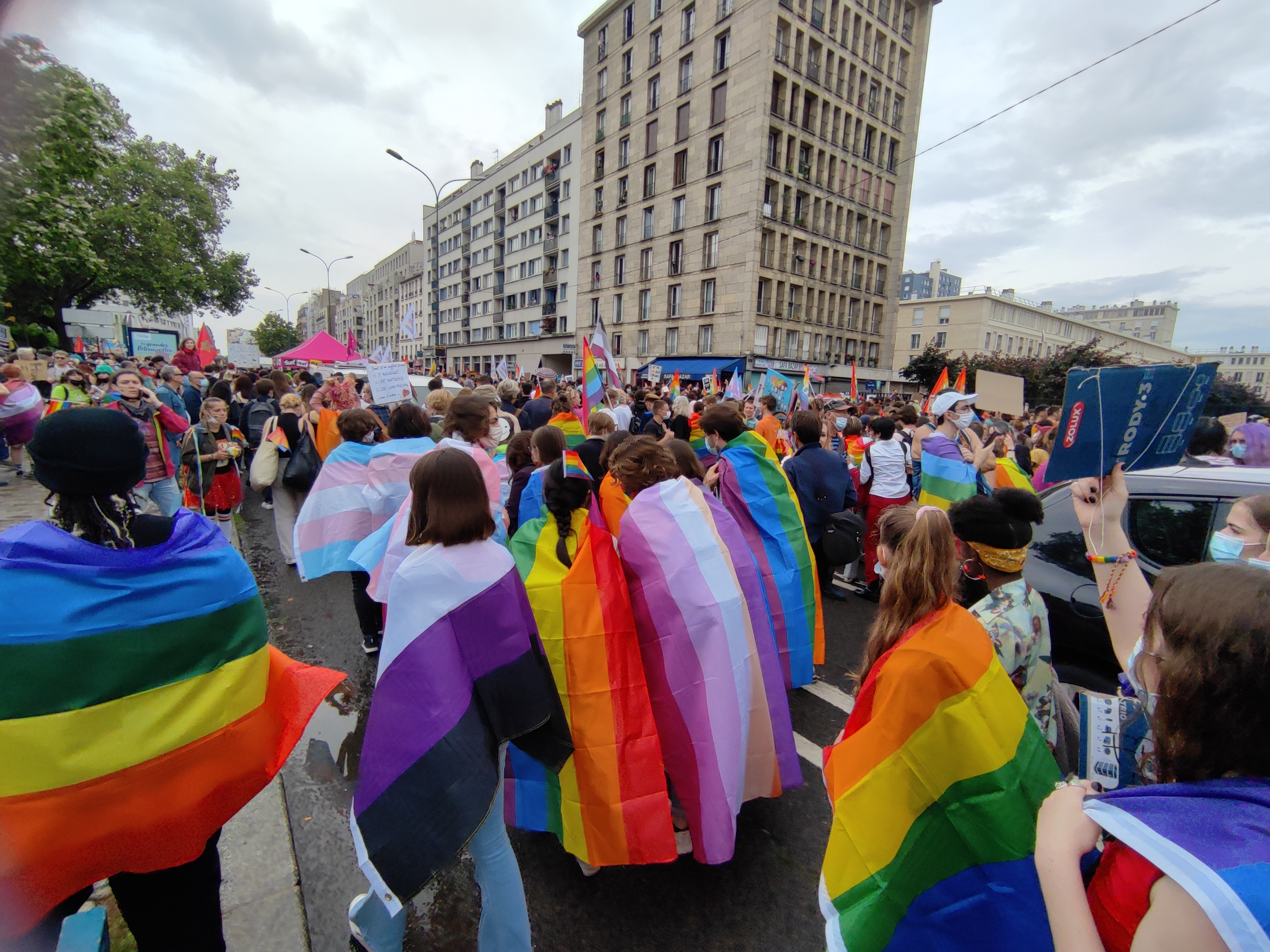
LGBTQIA+ Pride flags in the Paris Pride parade. 2021

The 2020 march was cancelled due to the COVID-19 pandemic and replaced by an online event. The 2021 edition took place under restrictions, starting from the suburbs to highlight its regional character and without floats. In 2023 organisers removed almost all motorised floats for ecological, security and equality reasons, retaining only vehicles for people with reduced mobility.

The 2024 and 2025 marches took place in a tense political context, with strong mobilisation against the rise of the far right and debates over inclusivity within the movement itself.

== Organisation ==
The march is coordinated by Inter-LGBT, a federation of more than 80 French LGBT associations. The route usually starts in central or eastern Paris and ends at Place de la République, where a concert and speeches are held. Attendance estimates vary widely: police figures are generally lower (tens of thousands) while organisers claim several hundred thousand participants.

== See also ==
- List of LGBT events
- LGBT rights in France
- EuroPride
- Pride parade
