= Transmania =

2024 French book

Transmania: Enquête sur les dérives de l'idéologie transgenre
- Author: Marguerite Stern
- Original title: Transmania: Enquête sur les dérives de l'idéologie transgenre
- Language: French
- Published: April 11, 2024
- Publisher: Éditions Magnus
- Pages: 398
- ISBN: 2-38422-040-3

Transmania: Enquête sur les dérives de l'idéologie transgenre (Note: (English: Transmania: An inquiry into the excesses of transgender ideology)) is a 2024 book written by Marguerite Stern and Dora Moutot and published by Éditions Magnus. A polemic targeting "transgender ideology", the book sparked controversy because it was considered transphobic and conspiratorial by critics.

== Content ==
The authors claim that what they term "transgender ideology" is a deliberate project to advance transhumanism and reduce womanhood to nothing.

The book defends the idea that womanhood should be defined by biological rather than "sentimental" factors, and that transgender identity is an "error in the location of erotic desire", i.e. "a sexual obsession [which] ends up occupying so much mental space that it becomes an identity."

== Reception ==
The book is considered transphobic by many figures. On April 17, 2024, the Paris town hall, through the voice of the first deputy Emmanuel Grégoire, publicly demanded the removal of advertisements of the book from the streets of Paris. Three days later, SOS Homophobie said it would file a complaint against the authors.

The outdoor advertising company JCDecaux removed posters it had put up promoting the book in Paris and apologized; they stated the posters were contrary to "[its] Charter of Ethics for External Communication".

Critics considered the book pseudoscientific and conspiratorial. They found fault with its endorsement of ideas refuted in academia, such as autogynephilia or rapid-onset gender dysphoria. Furthermore, they stated the book's methodology was unreliable, aimed purely at incriminating transgender causes; uninterested in perspectives other than those of transphobic feminist associations; and reliant on scientific studies since corrected and republished, without taking into account their correction. The magazine Têtu criticized the book's use of a vignette of a fictional sexually deviant transgender character to attack "transgender ideology" as heavy-handed, and based in stereotypes and degrading prejudices against transgender people and their sexuality.

The author J. K. Rowling, who was also accused of transphobia, spoke in May 2024 of her support for Dora Moutot in the face of the death threats that the latter received.

On October 5, 2024, 64 anti-fascist activists were taken into police custody. They intended to disrupt a book signing session for Transmania. These activists were released after being found to have been wrongly accused of possessing weapons and explosives, aside from two people referred for further questioning. Nevertheless, the Paris prosecutor's office confirmed the discovery of explosives. An article published on the activist website paris-luttes.info claimed responsibility for the demonstration. Dora Moutot and Marguerite Stern announced on October 16 that they were filing a complaint against this site, after it called for the "smashing of [their] heads." A few days after its release, the book was out of stock.
