= Geneviève Pastre =

French poet and activist (1924–2012)

Geneviève Pastre (20 November 1924 – 17 February 2012) was a French poet, academic and lesbian activist. She has been described as "responsible in a large measure for the creation of the Gay Liberation Movement in France", although she said of herself: "Je ne suis pas une activiste. Je suis poéte et danseuse" (I am not an activist. I am a poet and a dancer).

== Early life, education, and career ==
Pastre was born on 20 November 1924 in Mainz, Germany. She hoped to become a dancer but was encouraged by her parents to study classics, graduated from the Sorbonne, and gained her Agrégation teaching qualification. She taught in lycées in Saumur (1949-1955) and Montgeron (1955-1989).

She led a theatre group, which became known as the Geneviève Pastre Company, between 1960 and 1978.

She was married for eight years and had two daughters.

== Writing ==
Pastre published ten collections of poetry between 1972 and 2005. She came out as lesbian with the publication of her 1980 essay De l'Amour lesbien ("About lesbian love") and then published several historical works including Athènes et le Péril Saphique: Homosexualité Féminine en Grèce Antique (Athens and the Sapphic Peril: Homosexuality in Ancient Greece) and L'Homosexualité dans le Monde Antique (Homosexuality in the Ancient World), which are said to "analyze modern mythologizing of the Athenian democracy and other classical institutions from a uniquely feminist and gay perspective", in part in response to Michel Foucault's work The History of Sexuality which she thought suffered from his "misunderstanding of ancient languages and of lesbianism".

== Activism ==
Pastre was one of the founders of the Comité d'urgence anti-répression homosexuelle (CUARH), in 1979. In the early 1980s she was involved in the radio station Fréquence Gaie (initially a gay community radio station, and since evolved into Radio FG), and was its president from 1982 to 1984.

In the 1980s she set up a publishing house, Editions G. Pastre, to publish feminist and progressive writers, and was one of the founders of Les Octaviennes, an organisation of lesbian writers. In 1990 she organised the Festival européen de l’écriture gaie et lesbienne in Paris.

In 1995 she helped set up a new political party Les Mauves translated as The Lavender Party, which tried, but failed, to run a candidate in the 2002 French presidential election, but which was influential in bringing both France and the World Health Organization to stop classifying trans-sexualism as a mental disorder, and in encouraging Amnesty International to support the right to claim asylum for homosexual people in countries where homosexuality is illegael.

The Centre LGBT Paris-Île-de-France has named one of its rooms the Espace Geneviève Pastre in her memory.

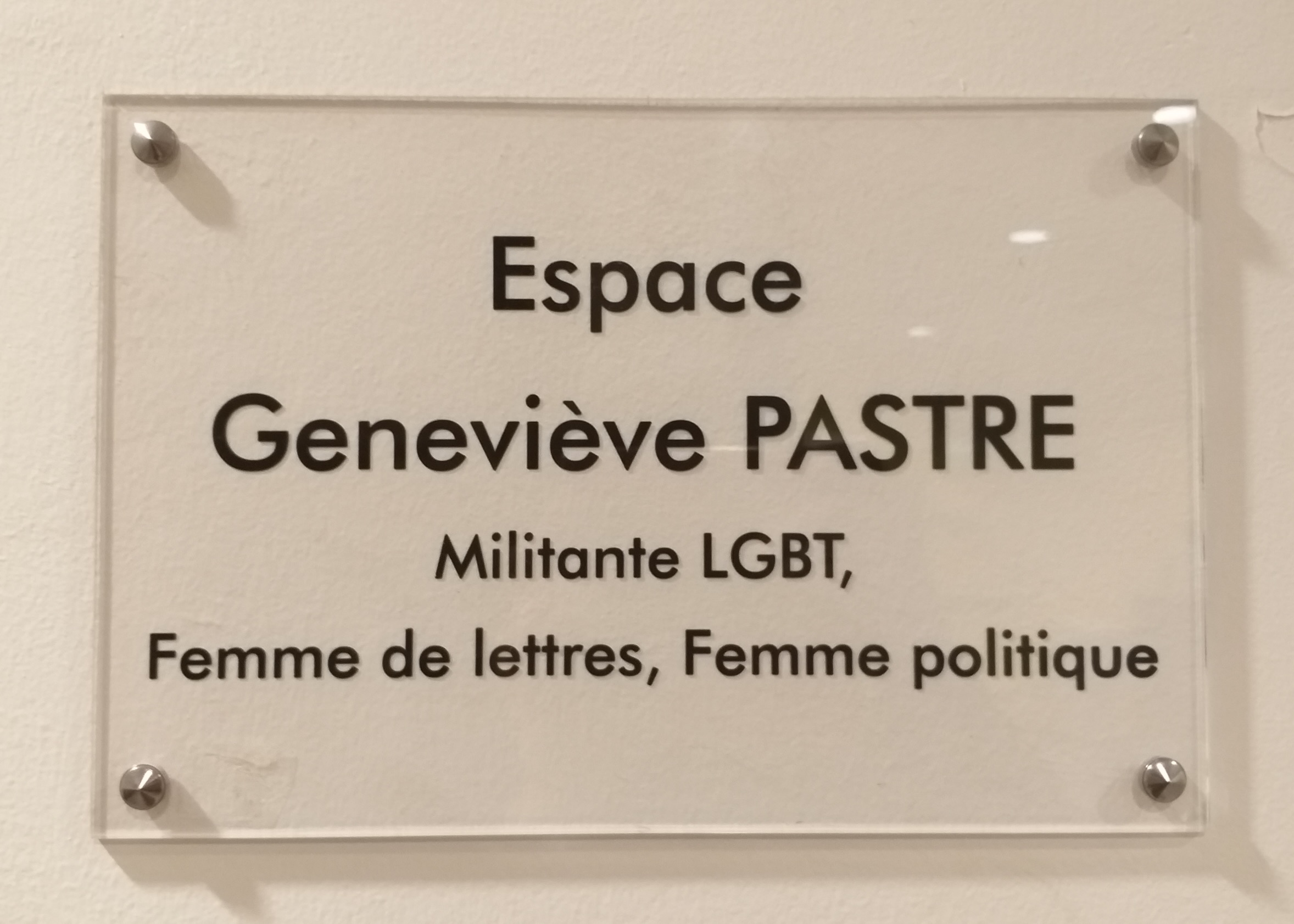
Plaque at the Centre LGBT Paris-Île-de-France

== Selected works ==
- Pastre, Geneviève (2002). Une femme en apesanteur : mémoires. Paris: Balland. ISBN 978-2715813922.
- Pastre, Geneviève (1980). De l'amour lesbien. Paris: P. Horay. ISBN 270580093X.
- Pastre, Geneviève (1987). Athènes et "le péril saphique" : homosexualité féminine en Grèce ancienne. Homosexualités dans le monde antique: 1. Paris: Libr. "Les Mots à la bouche". ISBN 978-2950089724.
- Pastre, Geneviève (1996). Les amazones : du mythe à l'histoire. Homosexualités dans le monde antique: 2. Paris: Editions G. Pastre. ISBN 978-2-908350-17-3.
