= List of LGBT political parties =

This is a list of political parties that were created to primarily represent the interests of the LGBTQ population in the nation in which each political party was registered.

- Ladlad (Philippines)
- Magi (Hebrew: מפלגת הגייז הישראלית – Israel)
- Embrace Diversity Political Movement (South Africa)
- Democratic Gay/Lesbian Party - The People's Party (Germany)
- Gay Party (Italy)
- Australian Equality Party (Marriage)
- Gay, Lesbian, Bisexual, Transsexual and Straight Party / We Are All Equal (Spain)
- Les Mauves (France)

== See also ==
- LGBTQ movements
- LGBTQ rights by country or territory
- List of LGBTQ organizations that affiliate with political parties
- List of LGBTQ rights organizations
- Pink vote
