= Les Mauves =

The Lavenders Les Mauves
- Leader: Geneviève Pastre
- Founded: May 7, 1999
- Dissolved: 2004
- Preceded by: Les Politides
- Newspaper: Etre(s) Humain(s)
- Ideology: LGBTQ rights Feminism; Anti-facism
- Political position: Syncretic

Les Mauves (The Lavenders) was a minor LGBTQ rights French political party founded by poet and lesbian activist, Geneviève Pastre.

== History ==
In 1994, poet and activist, Geneviève Pastre, founded a political club called Les Politides.

In 1998, Les Politides was transformed into a political party called Les Mauves and registered with the Official Journal of Associations in May 1999.

Pastre and her movement, including Les Mauves and Les Politides, were instrumental in persuading France to remove Homosexuality from their list of mental illnesses and for Amnesty International to accept banned homosexuality in one's home country as a grounds for asylum.

In the 2001 French municipal elections, Les Mauves attempted to run in multiple major cities. Pastre and her list for Paris's fifth arrondissement were declared ineligible. In Toulouse, Les Mauves representative, Hervé Hirrigoyen, on the Motivé-e-s list was excluded from the coalition formed by Motivé-e-s and François Simon. In Rennes four members of the party, Jacques Ars, Guenola Rouzic, Ludovic Jansen and Céline Reymond, were on the "Tous et toutes ensemble à gauche" list led by feminist activist Françoise Bagnaud and supported by Revolutionary Communist League. Bagnaud's list won 4% of the vote and missed the 10% threshold for the second round.

Geneviève Pastre tried to collect the 500 necessary signatures to become a candidate for the 2002 French presidential election, but her candidacy was invalidated by the Constitutional Council.

In the 2002 French legislative election, Les Mauves was a member of Concordat Citoyen a syncretic alliance of eleven parties lad by the Parti Blanc. They ran three candidates as part of the alliance, Pastre in the Fifth constituency of Paris with 27 votes, Lionel Cagniart in the Seventh constituency of Paris winning 45 votes and Hervé Hirigoyen in Haute-Garonne's 2nd constituency with 51 votes.

Cagniart and Pastre appeared on the ecologist De l'oxygène pour l'Île-de-France list led by Carine Pelegrin of Génération Écologie in the 2004 Île-de-France regional election. The list only obtained 2.51% of the vote and did not qualify for the second round. This was Les Mauves last foray into electoral politics and faded from the limelight after.

== See also ==
- List of LGBT political parties
- Homosexualités et Socialisme
- Front homosexuel d'action révolutionnaire
