= Same-sex unions and military policy =

The topic of same-sex unions and military service concerns the government treatment or recognition of same-sex unions (including same-sex marriages, civil unions, domestic partnerships or cohabitation) who may consist of at least one servicemember of a nation's military.

== Overview ==
The issue of recognition is usually predicated upon two pre-existing or debated criteria:

1. that same-sex unions are recognized or conferred legitimacy in the country or at some subdivision level of a nation's government
2. and that homosexuals and bisexuals can openly serve in the military without being punitively removed from service on the basis of their sexual orientation or conduct.

If both criteria are fulfilled, the question becomes a matter of how many rights, liberties or benefits are conferred by a military upon same-sex spouses of military servicemembers. Such stipulations include:

- Military housing provisions
- Military base security access clearance
- Insurance benefits
- Pensions
- Hospital visitation
- Inheritance and intestacy
- Custody or adoption of dependents
- Taxes
- Educational benefits
- Employment benefits
- Attendance of military social events
- Spousal registration and identification
- Retirement benefits for both spouses, even after a post-retirement divorce

== Adoption and parenting ==
No data currently exist on adoption of children or parenting by same-sex military families. In countries which legally recognize at least same-sex unregistered cohabitation, same-sex adoption and open service in the military, the allowance of same-sex adoption by such countries' armed forces is more likely assured.

In addition to the issues and occurrences which are encountered in general LGBT parenting, children in same-sex military families would also encounter issues which are endemic to children of opposite-sex military couples, such as deployment, frequent household reassignment, life among other military children (i.e., in school, playtime, socialization), care for wounded parents, life after the death of a parent, dependent benefits, and so on.

== By country ==
=== Africa ===
==== South Africa ====
In 2002 the South African National Defence Force extended medical and pension benefits, which had previously only been available to the spouses of military personnel, to their life partners without regard to gender. This came about as a consequence of the Constitutional Court's ruling in Satchwell v President of the Republic of South Africa; although that case involved the same-sex partner of a High Court judge, the reasoning was applicable to all government employees. Same-sex marriages have been possible since 2006 and are legally equivalent to opposite-sex marriages.

=== Americas ===
==== Brazil ====
The Brazilian Armed Forces recognize same-sex cohabitation unions and marriages and treats same-sex couples with military spouses as legally equivalent to different-sex couples. Married couples, though, may have more rights than those in "stable unions" or cohabitation.

==== Canada ====
The Canadian Armed Forces recognize same-sex marriages and treats same-sex couples with military spouses as legally equivalent to opposite-sex couples.

==== United States ====
Until 1993, military policy strictly forbid non-heterosexuals from serving in the military. In 1993, the military instated the "Don't ask, don't tell" policy, which only restricted non-heterosexuals from serving if they were open about their sexual orientation. In September 2011, this policy was repealed, allowing non-heterosexuals to openly serve in the military.

On 14 August 2013, the Department of Defense (DoD) announced that it would provide spousal and family benefits to servicemembers in same-sex marriages on the same terms as it does to those in different-sex marriages. The benefits, which include health care coverage, housing allowances, military ID cards, and survivor benefits, can be claimed retroactive to 26 June, the day of the Supreme Court decision in United States v. Windsor that held the statute under which the U.S. military was withholding those benefits, Section 3 of the Defense of Marriage Act, unconstitutional. A same-sex marriage must be documented by a marriage certificate that establishes that the marriage was valid where it was celebrated. The DoD also announced that servicemembers who need to travel to a jurisdiction that allows them to marry will be afforded 7 days leave to do so, 10 days if they are stationed outside the U.S. Secretary of Defense Chuck Hagel said: "This will provide accelerated access to the full range of benefits offered to married military couples throughout the department, and help level the playing field between opposite-sex and same-sex couples seeking to be married". The DoD set 3 September as its target date for implementation.

On 13 September 2013, VA home loan benefits were extended to include same sex marriages.

=== Europe ===
==== France ====
Since 1999, civil solidarity pacts (PACS) can be entered into by same-sex and opposite-sex couples, but do not possess several rights that married couples have. PACS are recognized by the French Armed Forces, but consequently confer fewer abilities or benefits to (same-sex or opposite-sex) couples than marriages.

Legislation passed by Parliament on 13 January 2011 granted military partners living under PACS equal access to pensions as those given to married opposite-sex couples. In France, same-sex couples are allowed to wed, and are eligible to full military family benefits under French law.

==== Ireland ====
The Irish Defence Forces allow for married service members to record their partnership status on their personnel file.

==== Portugal ====
Portugal allows all citizens to serve openly in the military regardless of sexual orientation, as the constitution explicitly forbids any discrimination on that basis, therefore openly allowing lesbians and gays to serve in the military. Their partners, married or not, are eligible for all benefits as is the case with other civil servants.

==== United Kingdom ====
Since December 2005, spouses in civil partnerships are entitled to spousal benefits (including life insurance benefits, pensions, employment benefits), immigration equality, and similar recognition as opposite-sex military spouses for tax purposes. Civil partners are also allowed accommodation in military housing, security clearance and allowances.

Since March 2014, UK military same-sex couples can get married (as well as UK civilians), under the Marriage (Same Sex Couples) Act 2013.

=== Oceania ===
==== Australia ====
On 9 December 2017 same-sex marriage was officially legalized throughout Australia. From 1 July 2009 couples of any sex have de facto the same legal rights and benefits as married couples. The Australian Defence Force policies on couples of any sex follow a directive from the Minister of Defense of 1 January 2010 that enforces the terms of the Same-Sex Relationships (Equal Treatment in Commonwealth Laws—Superannuation) Act 2008.

=== New Zealand ===
Same-sex civil unions became legal in 2005 and marriage became law in New Zealand in 2013.
