= Comité d'urgence anti-répression homosexuelle =

Association of French gay activist groups

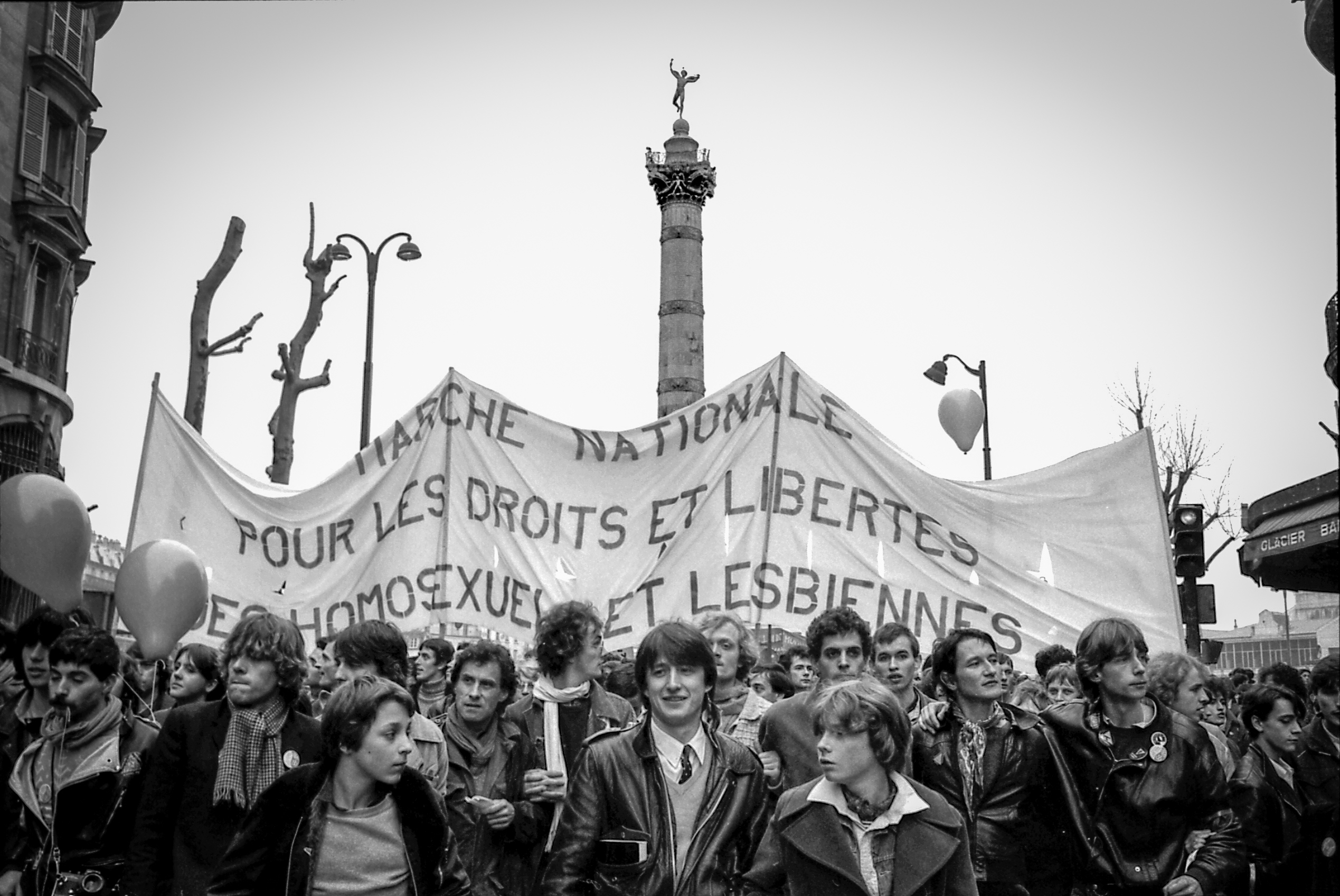
- CUARH organized the First National March for Gay Rights and Freedoms in Paris on 4 April 1981.
- Abbreviation: CUARH
- Formation: 28 August 1979; 47 years ago
- Dissolved: 1987; 39 years ago
- Type: LGBTQ rights, nonprofit
- Location: France

The Comité d'urgence anti-répression homosexuelle (transl. Emergency Committee Against Homosexual Repression; CUARH) was an association of French gay activist groups with the aim of fighting homophobic repression and anti-gay laws in France. It was founded in 1979 and dissolved in 1987.

== History ==
CUARH was established on 28 August 1979, during the first of the homosexual summer schools, as a nonprofit association under the French Association Act of 1901. Its founders included Geneviève Pastre, Hervé Liffran, Mélanie Badaire, Jan-Paul Pouliquen, and Jacques Fortin. In 1980, it brought together several gay associations, including the Groupes de libération homosexuels (GLH, "Homosexual Liberation Groups"), David and Jonathan, Beit Haverim, the Centre du Christ Libérateur, and the Mouvement d'information et d'expression des lesbiennes ("Lesbian Information and Expression Movement"). While CUARH was inclusive of both gay men and lesbians, lesbian organizations were a minority among its members. In 1983, out of a total of 71 member groups, only 14 were lesbian organizations.

The goal of CUARH was to end repression of homosexuality and discrimination against homosexuals. Some of CUARH's specific objectives included having homosexuality removed from the World Health Organization's International Classification of Diseases (ICD-9); ending the discrepancy in age of consent, which at the time was 14 for heterosexual intercourse and 18 for homosexual intercourse; ending over-criminalization of gay men through indecent exposure laws; (Note: At the time of CUARH's founding, homosexuality was deemed an aggravating circumstance in cases of public indecency under Article 330 of France's Criminal Code.) and addressing the difficulties lesbians faced in accessing housing and child custody when divorcing their husbands in order to live as lesbians.

In its operations, CUARH mobilized alliances of organizations that were best equipped to respond to specific situations. For example, one of the first cases it took on concerned a lesbian from Nantes who lost custody of her children after she began living with a woman. To defend her, CUARH mobilized not only Nantes's GLH but also branches of trade unions and political parties.

In 1981, CUARH publicized the case of Eliane Morissens, a teacher suspended without pay after she spoke about her homosexuality on television.

On 4 April 1981, in response to a call from CUARH, a reported 10,000 people marched in Paris in the first National March for Gay Rights and Freedoms. According to historian Mathias Quéré, this was a far greater turnout than any preceding gay and lesbian demonstration in Europe had seen, and activists were galvanized by the march. Three weeks later, on 26 April, then-presidential candidate François Mitterrand pledged that if he were elected, homosexuality would no longer be a crime in France. When Mitterrand won the presidential election on 10 May, CUARH unfurled a banner reading "Homos have chosen freedom."

Following the success of the march on 4 April 1981, CUARH organized another march for gay and lesbian rights in June 1982.

CUARH began publishing the monthly magazine Homophonies in November 1980. Initially distributed by CUARH's activist network, Homophonies saw wider distribution on Paris newsstands beginning with its nineteenth issue in May 1982, and then nationwide with its twenty-eighth issue in February 1983. It ceased publication in 1987.

== Integration of lesbians and gay men ==
=== In the context of the wider French gay movement ===
Although by the 1970s several French gay organizations, such as the Front homosexuel d'action révolutionnaire (FHAR), included both gay men and lesbians, lesbians were marginalized and their demands sidelined in favor of those of gay men. This marginalization of women, which was common to all left-wing movements of the time, also led to the split of FHAR's Gouines rouges collective.

Alliances between lesbians and gay men were also not a given in French lesbian activism at the time. On the heels of Monique Wittig's 1978 essay "The Straight Mind", the early 1980s saw the birth of France's radical lesbianism movement, a lesbian-specific activism that did not seek alliance with either men or heterosexual women. As a result, CUARH came to be the only viable option for some lesbians who did not identify with radical lesbianism. Other lesbians were drawn to CUARH's reformist aims, focused on legal structures and the concrete improvement of homosexuals' daily lives, which stood in contrast to political lesbianism, where lesbian identity was seen as a starting point for revolutionizing society.

The debate about lesbian inclusion and political leanings was largely specific to Paris. In many other cities, there was no choosing between groups, as CUARH was the only gay activist group present. Some Parisian lesbians came to see the readiness with which non-Parisian lesbians embraced CUARH as evidence that non-Parisian lesbians lacked political will, when in reality it was a necessity due to material constraints.

=== Within CUARH ===
For historian Justine Fourgeaud, the writings of CUARH reflect not a vision of a unified homosexual identity but a strategic alliance between two distinct identities, lesbian women and gay men, who found themselves affected by the same issues. This alliance extended to feminism as a whole, with CUARH, for example, taking a position in favor of abortion. Fourgeaud also notes that the presence of lesbians was seen as a motivator for gay men to confront their own misogyny and heteronormativity.

CUARH explicitly sought to make lesbian inclusion possible within the association. Half of the covers of Homophonies featured lesbians, and the editorial staff of Homophonies strived to speak equally about gay and lesbian issues. The alternation of covers featuring gay men and lesbians came with a financial cost, as the covers featuring women did not sell as well as those featuring men. Homophonies became one of the few magazines that fought against the invisibility of lesbians in France, in particular by disseminating information concerning lesbian events. During the second CUARH-organized march, in 1982, the head of the procession was a lesbian who did not ally with gay men. This choice was also criticized within the movement.

The inclusion of both gay men and lesbians within CUARH was not without its challenges. In particular, there was tension between gay male members' desire to be able to freely express and represent their sexuality and lesbian members' criticism of male sexual domination. These criticisms from lesbian members were seen by gay members as a form of prudishness, while lesbians perceived the reduction of a feminist critique to prudishness as misogyny and lesbophobia. Some particularly virulent critics described the publication of a photograph of a penis in Homophonies as a form of rape.

== See also ==
- Front homosexuel d'action révolutionnaire – Radical 1970s union between lesbian feminists and gay male activists
- LGBTQ culture in France
- LGBTQ history in France
