= Civil solidarity pact =

Form of civil union in France

In France, a civil solidarity pact (French: pacte civil de solidarité), commonly known as a PACS (pronounced [paks]), is a contractual form of civil union between two adults for organising their joint life. It brings rights and responsibilities, but less so than marriage. The PACS was voted for by the French Parliament in October 1999, largely to offer some legal status to same-sex couples.

From a legal standpoint, a PACS is a contract drawn up between the two individuals, which is stamped and registered by the clerk of the court. In some areas, couples signing a PACS have the option of undergoing a formal ceremony at the city hall identical to that of civil marriage. Since 2006, individuals who have registered a PACS are no longer considered single in terms of their marital status; their birth records will be amended to show their status as pacsé.

PACS remain available to both same and opposite-sex couples despite the introduction of marriage and adoption rights for same-sex couples in May 2013.

== History ==
The French National Assembly failed to pass PACS in October 1998. The law was proposed by the left-of-center government of Prime Minister Lionel Jospin, and was very vocally opposed by people, mostly on the right-wing, who opposed LGBT rights. Those, such as Christine Boutin and Philippe de Villiers, argued that PACS and the recognition of homosexual unions would be disastrous for French society. Only one right-wing deputy, Roselyne Bachelot, declared herself in favour of PACS.

The law (Loi n°99-944 du 15 novembre 1999 relative au pacte civil de solidarité) was voted by the French Parliament in November 1999 following some controversy. The debate is remembered for a few incidents, such as when Christine Boutin attempted to filibuster the bill by speaking for five hours in the French National Assembly, and at some point waved a Christian Bible in the direction of the speaker of the Assembly—a surprising gesture in a country where laïcité (implying no intervention of religion into political matters) is specified in the Constitution. Christine Boutin also said, "All civilizations that recognized and justified homosexuality as a normal lifestyle met decadence." Anti-PACS proponents also staged a series of street protests, but the turnout, by their own admission, was disappointingly low. At its creation, Jacques Chirac described PACS as "not adapted to the needs of families". However, most initial opponents now widely accept the PACS (including Jacques Chirac and Christine Boutin, who publicly changed their minds).

It was to be a marked improvement and alternative over the previous certificat de concubinage notoire, which had minimal rights (and responsibilities) and had been seen as having pejorative overtones. The situation of concubinage only made certain benefits extend to the other partner in a union, and did not settle any issue regarding property, taxes, etc.

Initially, PACS offered the right to file joint income taxes only after three years. As of 2005, all PACS couples are required to file joint taxes, in the same manner as married couples. Due to the way that the progressive tax is applied in France, a couple filing joint income taxes, in almost all cases, pays less tax than they would filing separately if one of the partners earns substantially more than the other.

Wealth tax (the Impôt de solidarité sur la fortune) has been applied to the combined assets of both partners since the introduction of the PACS in 1999.

In 2004, PACS was described in a report to the Garde des Sceaux (minister for justice) as "a new way of conjugality, answering many needs and inscribed in continuity".

Laws regarding same-sex partnerships in Europe¹ Marriage Civil union Limited domestic recognition (cohabitation) Unrecognized Constitution limits marriage to opposite-sex couples ¹ May include recent laws or court decisions that have not yet entered into effect.

In December 2004, the French Government began preparations for expanding the rights granted in PACS. French LGBT groups considered it a tactic for avoiding debate on same-sex marriage.

A parliamentary "Report on the Family and the Rights of Children" was released on 25 January 2006. Although the committee recommended increasing some rights given in PACS in areas such as property rights, laws of succession and taxation, it recommended maintaining prohibitions against marriage, adoption, and access to medically assisted reproduction for same-sex couples. Because of this, left-wing members of the committee rejected the report. The report also argued that the differences in rights between concubinage, PACS and marriage reflect different levels of commitment and obligations on the part of the couples who enter into them. The committee renewed its support for this tiered system and recommended that the various rights and obligations of each type of union be clearly explained to couples when they register for a PACS, marry, or have a child.

== Figures ==
PACS (blue) and marriage (red) in France (INSEE)

According to the 2004 Demographic Report by the National Institute of Statistics and Economic Studies (Insee), the number of marriages in France had fallen each year since 2000.

266,000 civil marriages took place in 2004, a decline of 5.9% from 2003. However, the report found that the number of couples getting PACS had increased every year except 2001. There was a 29% increase in PACS between 2001 and 2002 and a 25% increase between 2002 and 2003. For the first 9 months of 2004, 27,000 PACS were signed compared to 22,000 in 2003. The report found that one PACS in 10 had been dissolved (less than divorces for couples married for the same period, for which one marriage in three will be dissolved by divorce or separation after the first 3 years during which most signed PACS are dissolved before becoming more stable than marriages).

A parliamentary report released in January 2006 said a total of around 170,000 PACS had been signed.

Year	PACS between same-sex couples	PACS between opposite-sex couples	Total PACS	Total marriages between opposite-sex couples	% same-sex unions
2000	5,412	16,859	22,271	305,234	1.65
2001	3,323	16,306	19,629	295,720	1.05
2002	3,622	21,683	25,305	286,169	1.16
2003	4,294	27,276	31,570	282,756	1.37
2004	5,023	35,057	40,080	278,439	1.58
2005	4,865	55,597	60,462	283,036	1.42
2006	5,071	72,276	77,347	273,914	1.44
2007	6,221	95,778	101,999	273,669	1.66
2008	8,201	137,801	146,002	265,404	1.99
2009	8,434	166,089	174,523	251,478	1.98
2010	9,143	196,415	205,558	251,654	2.00
2011	7,494	144,675	152,169	236,826	1.93
2012	6,969	153,670	160,639	245,930	1.71
2013	6,054	162,072	168,126	231,225	1.52
2014	6,262	167,469	173,731	230,770	1.55
2015	7,017	181,930	188,947	228,565	1.68
2016	7,112	184,425	191,537	225,612	1.70
2017				221,000	

== New Caledonia and Wallis and Futuna ==
In April 2009, the French National Assembly voted to approve the extension of PACS to two French overseas collectivities: New Caledonia and Wallis and Futuna. Thus, couples in New Caledonia and Wallis and Futuna are able to enter a PACS in the same way as couples in Metropolitan France. Given their autonomous status, these collectivities did not automatically begin performing PACS when they were introduced in Metropolitan France in 1999. French Polynesia is the only collectivity where PACS cannot be performed.

== Current trends ==
Although the law was passed with same-sex couples in mind, the great majority of couples taking advantage have been heterosexual couples who, for one reason or another, choose civil union rather than marriage; moreover, more heterosexual couples are opting for civil union rather than marriage. In fact, this trend was already in place in 2000, with 75% of unions between heterosexual couples (42% the previous years) and 95% in 2009. The process is commonly referred to as se pacser (IPA: [pakse], getting PACSed).

== See also ==
- LGBT rights in France
- Recognition of same-sex unions in Europe
- Same-sex marriage in France
- Same-sex unions and military policy – France
