= Gay Party =

Gay Party Partito Gay
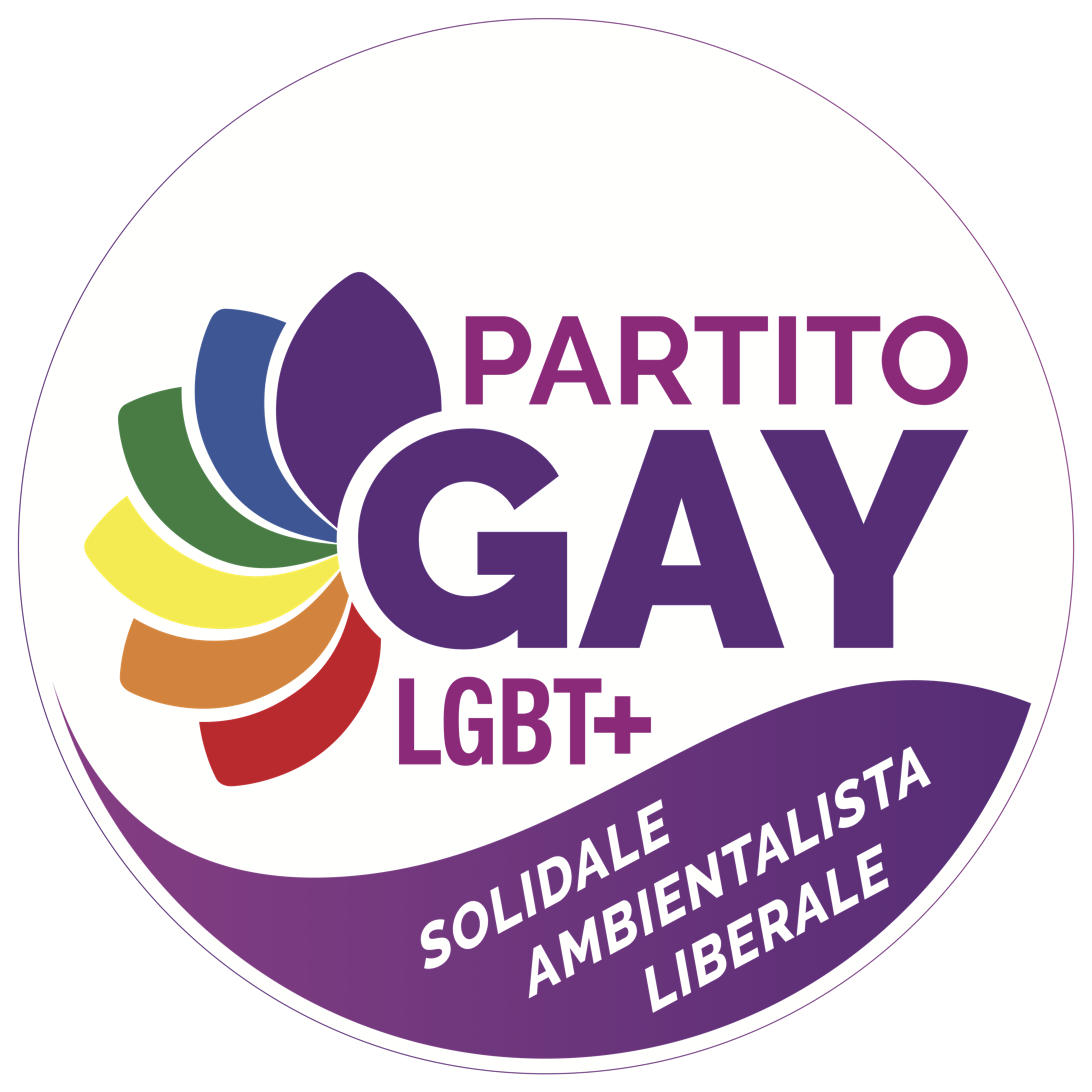
- Leader: Fabrizio Marrazzo
- Founded: 19 November 2020
- Ideology: LGBT rights Liberalism; Environmentalism
- Political position: Centre-left
- Colours: Purple
- Chamber of Deputies: 0 / 400
- Senate: 0 / 200

Website
- partito.gay

The Gay Party (Italian: Partito Gay), officially the Gay Party for LGBT+ Rights, Solidary, Environmentalist and Liberal (Italian: Partito Gay per i diritti LGBT+, Solidale Ambientalista e Liberale), is an Italian political group, being the first one specifically aimed at defending the rights of sexual diversity.

== History ==
The origins of the party date back to 2018, when Fabrizio Marrazzo (LGBT activist, spokesman for the Gay Center and former president of Arcigay in Rome) registered on 30 August the "Partito Gay" brand, which included a logo containing a band with the colours of the LGBT flag and the phrase "Europe Italy" at the top. At that time, Marrazzo pointed out that the party was in an embryonic stage waiting to be able to develop it at a massive level in future elections and he hoped to capture between 6% and 15% of the votes.

The party was publicly presented on 19 November 2020, in an act led by Marrazzo in addition to LGBT activists Claudia Toscano and Vittorio Tarquini. The party defines solidarity, environmentalism and liberalism among its programmatic pillars. The presentation of the party generated criticism from within the LGBT community, given that they consider that civil rights cannot be defended in a sectorial manner according to each group.

Among the actions of the party in its first months of activity was accusing soccer player Zlatan Ibrahimovic of homophobia for comments made at the 71st San Remo Festival, where he made jokes about the singer Achille Lauro, and a request that the Giardini Pubblici Indro Montanelli of Milan be renamed Raffaella Carrà in tribute to her recent death and in rejection of the racist comments Montanelli made during his lifetime.

The Gay Party presented candidacies for the municipal elections of 2021, mainly in the cities of Rome, Milan and Turin, where Fabrizio Marazzo, Mauro Festa and Davide Betti Balducci were presented as mayoral candidates, respectively. In the case of Turin, the party has denounced homophobia on the part of the administrators of the condominium where the group's local headquarters are located due to the difficulties they have presented in displaying the LGBT flag and party symbols, as well as in carrying out campaign activities.

For the 2022 Italian general election, the party failed to collect the 80,000 signatures necessary to be able to register, and on 22 August they announced an agreement with the Five Star Movement to carry two candidates (Fabrizio Marrazzo and Marina Zela) on the party's lists. Neither of them managed to get elected.

== Election results ==
=== Italian Parliament ===
| Election | Leader | Chamber of Deputies | | | | Senate of the Republic | | | |
| Election | Leader | Votes | % | Seats | +/– | Votes | % | Seats | +/– |
|---|---|---|---|---|---|---|---|---|---|
| 2022 | Fabrizio Marrazzo | Into M5S | | 0 / 400 | New | Into M5S | | 0 / 200 | New |

== See also ==
- LGBT rights in Italy
- LGBT movements
- List of LGBT political parties
- Love Party (Italy)
