= Pansexuality Days =

Awareness day for pansexuality

Pansexuality is celebrated internationally on different dates throughout the year. Pansexual Visibility Day is a commemorative date that takes place on May 24, while Pansexual Pride Day takes place on December 8, both days celebrated by the pansexual and panromantic community and their supporters.

== History ==
=== Pansexual Visibility Day ===
Pansexual Visibility Day appears to have originated from a post on Tumblr. This day was first celebrated in 2015, with 2014 also being recognized as a start date within the community. In all cases, it is an initiative of activists.

The celebration of the date is resumed in subsequent years through different platforms and broadcasters of the pansexual community, such as in 2020, 2023 and 2024.

=== Pansexual Pride Day ===
Pansexual Pride Day, also known as International Pansexuality Day, originated as a tribute to a 1998 demonstration on December 8 in Santa Cruz, California, aimed at increasing the visibility of the pansexual community. The date is also celebrated on the 18th.

In 2024, the U.S. Department of Health and Human Services' social media account posted a message celebrating the date, which generated reactions from Trump supporters such as Elon Musk and Caitlyn Jenner.
