= SOS Homophobie =

LGBT support organization in France

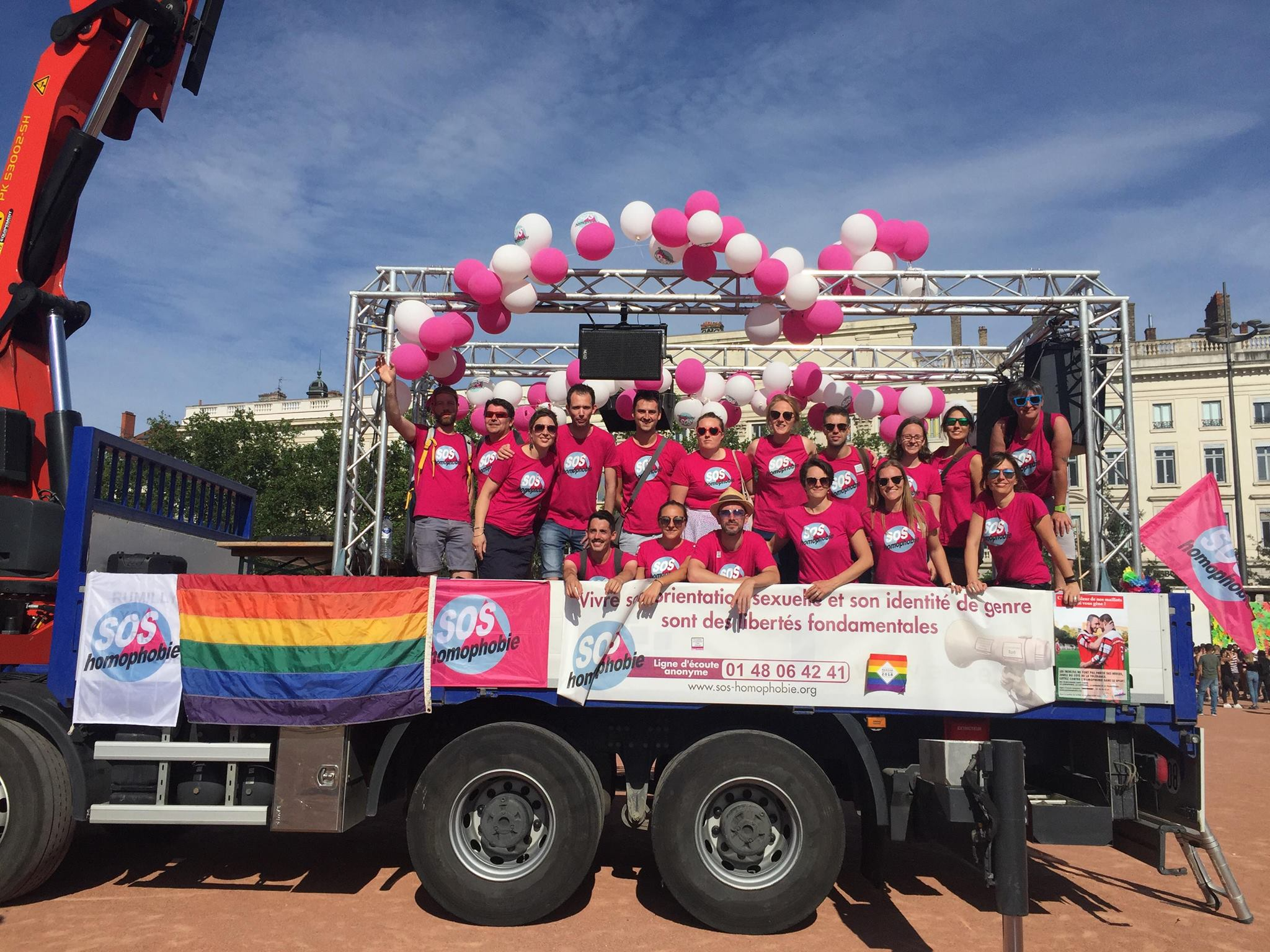
- SOS Homophobie at the 2018 Pride March in Lyon

SOS Homophobie is an LGBTQ support organization based in France that deals with homophobia. The organization currently consists of 900 volunteer members as well as 17 regional offices, all of which are based in France. The group is frequently mentioned on various media such as social media sites, television, and print. SOS homophobie provides national support programs including an anonymous hotline, testimonials on websites and support offered through postal mail. The main objectives of the organization are to support those who have fallen victim to homophobia and to run homophobia prevention events. Moreover, the organization aims to ultimately achieve equality between homosexual and heterosexual couples, and equal treatment for people despite sexual orientation.

== History ==
SOS homophobie was initially established on 11 April 1994 as a solely volunteer-only based initiative. The goal was to develop a helpline for LGBT individuals of France. In 1997 yearly reports were written and continue to be made each year. A webpage has been made in order for youth to clarify their understanding of LGBT.

=== Fields of activity ===
Between 2010 and 2011, SOS homophobie took part in various events aiming to protect and raise public awareness of the rights of LGBTQ people. The following are examples of such:

- The Trail of Sexualities in Lyon
- The International Day against Homophobia
- The Gay Pride LGBT and Gay Prides in Paris and the region
- The Day of the Fight against AIDS
- LGBT Associations Printemps in Paris or the first LGBT Salon de Lille.

SOS homophobie continues to be actively involved regarding issues related to the LGBT community. In 2012, counsel, Caroline Mecary, represented the association and responded to France’s Constitutional Council deferral decision on gay marriage. She claims that "it is probably necessary to wait for an alternative policy in 2012, so that the parties of the Left, which are favorable to the opening of marriage and adoption for same-sex couples, initiate a reform."

=== Cooperation ===
From 2006 and beyond, SOS homophobie has met with representatives of several influential LGBT organizations – MANEO (Germany), Lambda Warsaw (Poland), and KPH Kampania Przewic Homofobie (Poland). The groups have held conferences in which they discussed relevant issues. Together they have joined to achieve a common purpose - to fight against homophobia and support the creation of a world with increased equality. They signed a joint declaration, the “Tolerancja Declaration”, to achieve these goals. The objectives of the “Tolerancja Declaration” are as such:

- Regular expert meetings to exchange ideas and suggestions for project implementation
- Improvements in the recording of and assessment of homophobia related violence in respective countries
- Promotion of the “International Day Against Homophobia” (May 17) with actions and events
- A joint European prize, the “Tolerantia Prize”, to be given to individual(s) for their efforts in protecting the rights and freedoms of homosexuals’

In 2008, four groups agreed to cooperate with the Spanish gay-Lesbian organizations TRIANGULO and COGAM in the “Berliner Bündnis gegen homophobie und Hassgewalt(Berlin Alliance Against Homophobia and Hate Violence)” in order to increase networks and strengthen their initiatives.

== Areas of work ==
- Online Testimonies
  - Collect and gather information through listening to different communication channels like the anonymous hotline services, to create online testimonies.
- Annual Reports
  - Published annual reports to tackle the issues that arise from homophobia in France.
- School Intervention
  - Provide sufficient training for volunteers prior to setting up debates with students to solve their confusion with regards to homophobia. The aim to promote the idea of gay, lesbian, bisexual and transgender to prevent students from participating in gender discriminatory acts, bullying and violent acts.
- Internet Regulation
  - To stop the rapid spread of LGBT discrimination prominent on certain webpages. It focuses mainly on Twitter with hashtags like “#TeamHomophobe” and “#UnGayMort”.

== See also ==
- LGBT rights in France
- List of LGBT rights organizations
