= Inter-LGBT =

French nonprofit group of LGBT organisations

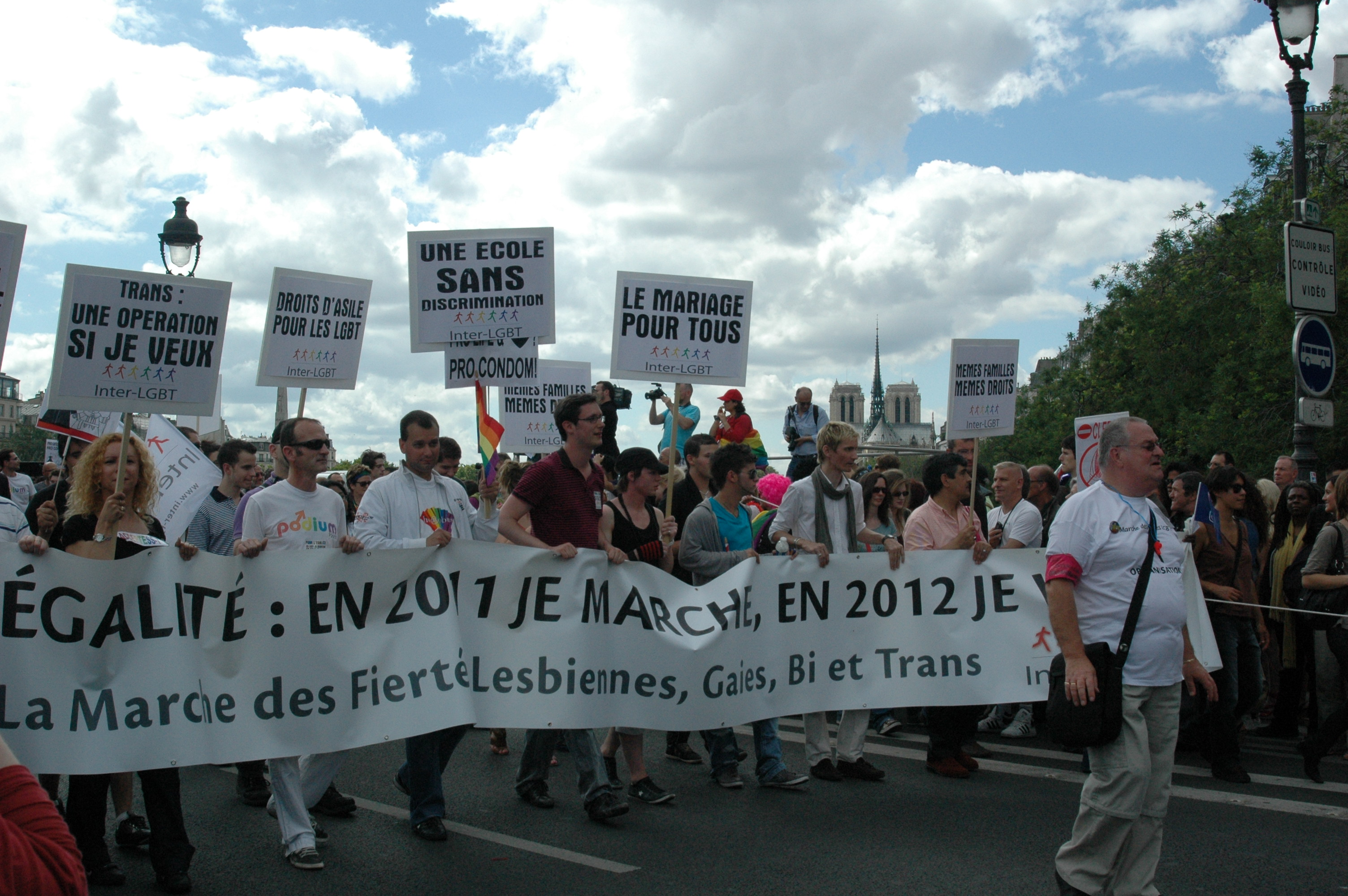
- Types: nonprofit organization
- Legal status: declared association
- Coordinates: 48°51′50″N 2°21′42″E
- Website: www.inter-lgbt.org

Inter-LGBT (Interassociative Lesbienne, Gaie, Bi et Trans) is an umbrella group of 50 LGBT organisations in France.

== Overview ==
It organises the Printemps des Assoces every April as well as the annual Gay marches. Its headquarters, located in Le Marais, has a library open to the public.

Inter-LGBT is considered to be a lobby by its former spokesman Alain Piriou. It is a member of ILGA-Europe.
