= Civitas (movement) =

French advocacy group (1999–2023)

- Predecessor: Cité catholique
- Formation: 1999
- Dissolved: 2023
- Headquarters: Argenteuil (Val-d'Oise), France
- Methods: Teaching classes, conferences, protests
- Fields: Traditionalist Catholic activism
- Members: c. 1000 (2013)
- President: Alain Escada
- Main organ: Civitas — Revue catholique des questions politiques et sociales
- Website: www.civitas-institut.com

Civitas, also known as France Jeunesse Civitas and Institut Civitas, was a Traditionalist Catholic, integrist, nationalist, organization on the extreme right. The association defined itself as a "Traditionalist Catholic lobby group". The group was once associated with the Society of St. Pius X, but it has evolved under the new leadership of Alain Escada and the "chaplaincy" is now provided by Capuchin Friars of Morgon. On 14 February 2023, the Global Project Against Hate and Extremism (GPAHE) released a report in which it classified Civitas as a "religious nationalist", "anti-LGBTQ+", and "conspiracy" group.

== History ==
Civitas was formed in 1999. It, and ICHTUS, were split out from the integrist Cité catholique movement founded by the pro-Vichy intellectual Jean Ousset.

Its media prominence dates from the appointment of its current president, Alain Escada, a Belgian militant of the extreme right with a background of Traditionalist Catholicism and Belgian nationalism, and an ex-member of the New Belgian Front (French: Front nouveau de Belgique, FNB), from which he was expelled in 1997.

Escada became the secretary-general of Civitas in 2009. In 2012, he replaced François de Penfentenyo as president of Civitas.

At the start of 2013, Civitas claimed 1,000 members and 170,000 "sympathisers" on its mailing list. Civitas had ambitions of winning 300 seats in the French municipal elections of 2014.

In 2016, Civitas announced a status change, from a cultural organization to a French political party. It was a major part of the Coalition pour la Vie et la Famille, a tiny European party.

On 4 October 2023, Civitas was officially dissolved by the French government.

== Aims ==
Civitas promotes the reChristianisation of France and Europe. It defines itself as a social and political movement in the "Traditionalist Catholic lobby", a "movement whose cause is the restoration to society of the kingship of Our Lord Jesus Christ". It is not interested in taking part in abstract political theory, but instead teaches "techniques... useful in discussions on the subversive dialectic, learning fundamental skills for effective action: speaking in public meetings, launching associations, concrete action, etc."

For historian Étienne Fouilloux, this militant association, in promoting the establishment of the restoration of the Kingdom of Christ on Earth, is against republicanism and thus the French Republic itself:

Civitas joue dans les mouvements catholiques un rôle homologue à celui des trotskystes ou des anarchistes dans les manifestations de gauche [...] celui d'une minorité agissante moins soucieuse de solutions concrètes que de tension révolutionnaire (ou contre-révolutionnaire)

[In Catholic circles, Civitas plays a role similar to that of Trotskyites or Anarchists in Leftist demonstrations ..., they are an activist minority less interested in finding concrete solutions than fomenting revolutionary (or counter-revolutionary) tension]

— Étienne Fouilloux, Réflexions d’historien sur la loi Taubira (2013)

== Activism ==
=== Opposition to theatrical performances ===
Civitas came to public attention in 2011, in Paris, when it demonstrated for several consecutive evenings in opposition to the performance of some plays, notably Romeo Castellucci's Sur le concept du visage du fils de Dieu (original Italian: Sul concetto di volto nel figlio di Dio, "On the concept of the Son of God's face") at the Théâtre de la Ville — one performance was interrupted by militants who climbed on stage and threw eggs and waste oil over the audience — but also against the Théâtre du Rond-Point who were performing Rodrigo Garcia's Golgota Picnic, which they judged blasphemous.

Civitas denounced what it called "Christianophobia" and organised another, larger demonstration on 29 October 2011, while Cardinal André Vingt-Trois, the president of the Bishops' Conference of France, restated that the demonstrators ne disposent d'aucun mandat pour défendre l’Église ("Had no mandate to defend the Church").

==== Arrests and fines ====
34 people were arrested for disturbing the performance Sur le concept du visage du fils de Dieu at the Théâtre de la Ville in Paris in October 2011. 32 were arrested and in June 2013 appeared before a Paris tribunal for "obstructing freedom of expression", which carried a fine of up to €5,000. Two defendants were found not guilty; three were found guilty and fined €1,500, €1,800, and €2,000; the others were fined between €600 and €800.

=== Opposition to same-sex marriage ===
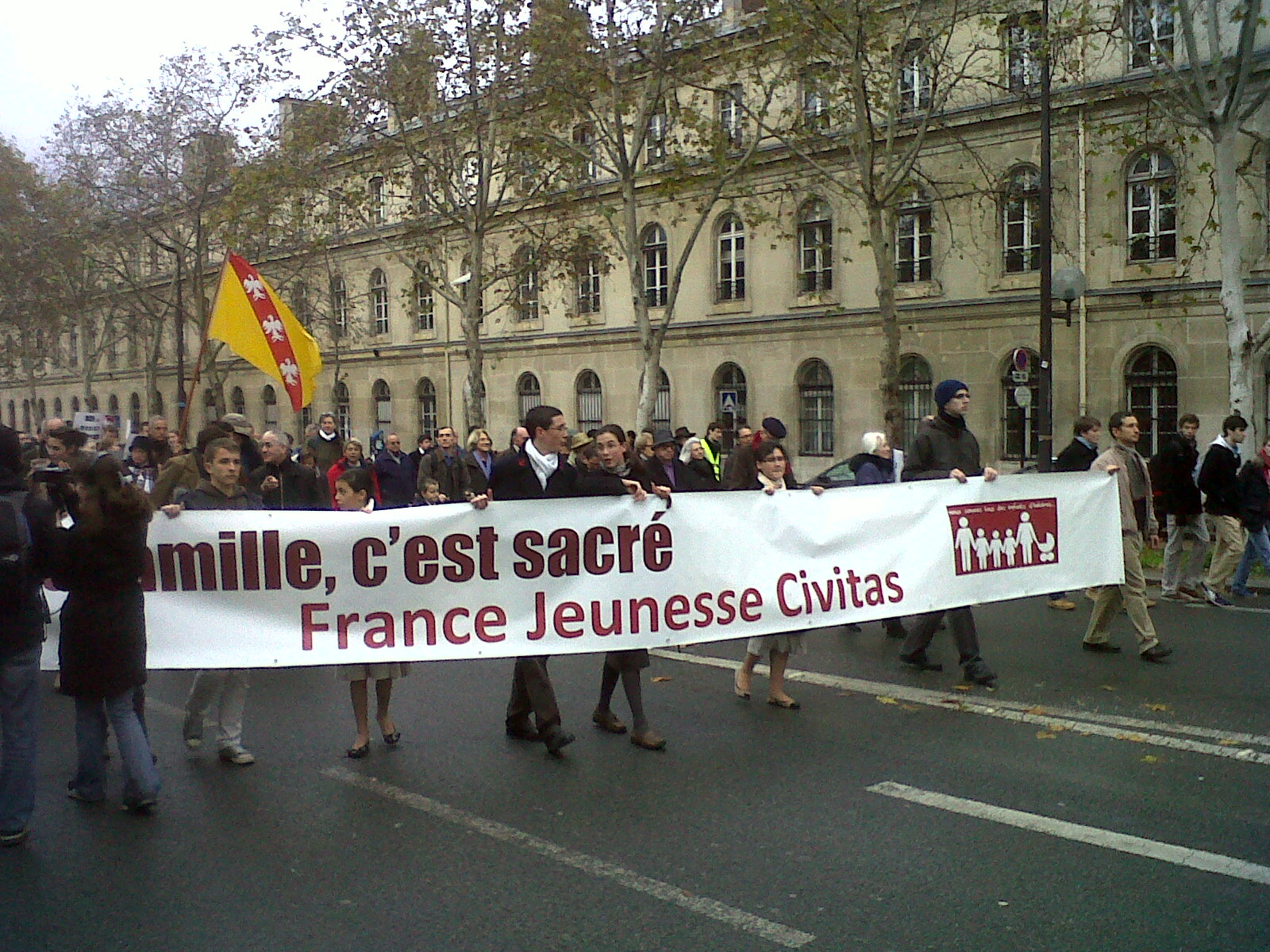
Non à l'homofolie ("No to gay madness") demonstration, 18 November 2012

In June 2012, Civitas released a tract with the slogan Confieriez-vous des enfants à ces gens-là? ("Would you trust your children with these men?"). On the photo, of a gay pride parade, one can see two naked men.

In November 2012, Civitas organised a march from the Ministry of the Family to the Assemblée Nationale, demonstrating against the policy of "Marriage for all"; according to police sources, nearly 8,000 people marched against "homofolie" ("gay madness").

On 13 January 2013, the association La Manif pour tous — organised to protest the proposed law allowing same-sex marriage, but which excluded Civitas — called for a national demonstration against the proposed law. Civitas militants, who had opposed the "Barjot concept", gathered to leave from the Place Pinel. They protested against same-sex marriage with the motto "Catholics for the Family". The organisers claimed attendance of 50,000, but police sources claimed around 8,000, while reports differed across the media, such as in Le Monde and Le Nouvel Observateur. L'Express said there were "several thousand demonstrators".

=== Opposition to "gender theory" ===
At the end of January 2014, Civitas backed Farida Belghoul, who had initiated journées de retrait de l'école ("stay away from school days") in protest against the supposed teaching of what she called "gender theory" (French: théorie du genre, more often called Gender studies) in public establishments. In this context, Civitas was criticised for a photo series on its website showing a sex education teacher in compromising sexual positions. Accused by the Press and his opponents of spreading false rumours (the photo came from Canada), Civitas justified their actions by saying they did not have the means to authenticate its origins and it was not out of character for their chosen subject. In response, Le Monde published an article demonstrating that verifying the images' origins was trivial and quick.

A new row developed some days later, when Civitas called for harassment of the TV network Arte to prevent the broadcast of the critically acclaimed film Tomboy, which Civitas called "gender theory propaganda" (propagande pour l’idéologie du genre). Civitas stated that Ce film ne répond pas à la mission d'Arte qui est de "concevoir, réaliser et diffuser des émissions de télévision ayant un caractère culturel ("This film does not fulfill Arte's mission as the 'inventor, maker and broadcaster of television programmes of a cultural nature'"). Civitas advocated protesting poliment mais fermement! Par téléphone, par fax ou par mail ("Politely, but firmly, by telephone, fax or post").

== Controversies ==
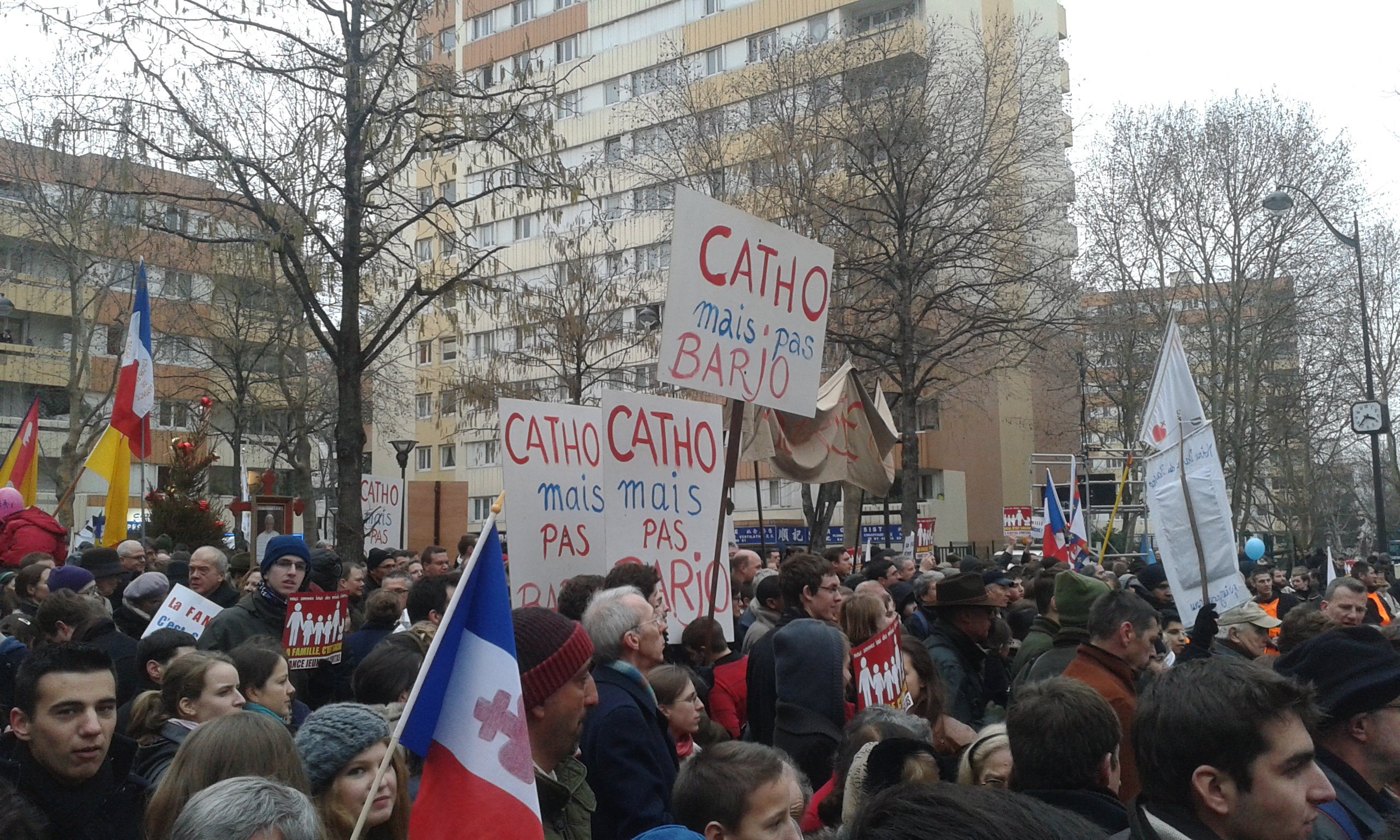
Civitas at the 13 January demonstration at the Place Pinel

Civitas' actions against the Romeo Castellucci play were deprecated by diverse groups, including the Mayor of Paris and senior Catholic dignitaries.

Najat Vallaud-Belkacem, a government spokesperson, said that Civitas's slogan Non à l'homofolie ("No to gay madness"), used at the November 2012 demonstration, was "misplaced". Other incidents occurred on the margins of the event. Some members of the feminist group FEMEN, topless and wearing a parody of a nun's habit, used powder fire extinguishers to spray demonstrators including, according to the organisers, children. Journalist Caroline Fourest, an AFP photographer and FEMEN were attacked and some were beaten. The police made five arrests. After these incidents, six socialist députés (elected politicians) demanded the break-up of Civitas.

According to the historian Galia Ackerman, it is part of Civitas's order of service to attack Femen. According to the writer René Guitton:

L'institut intégriste avait voulu se distinguer des autres courants catholiques en initiant sa propre marche, celle en marge de laquelle des militantes féministes et des journalistes furent agressés par des participants au défilé

[This integrist institution had wanted to distinguish itself from other Catholic groups by having its own march, on the margins of which the marchers attacked feminists and journalists]

— René Guitton, La France des intégristes extrémistes juifs, chrétiens, musulmans (2013)

But according to Civitas, the demonstration was a "victim" of militant feminists. Siding with Civitas, Jacques Bompard, deputy mayor of Orange, denounced the feminists who, according to him, were responsible for the outbursts. Civitas said they had filed a complaint for exhibitionism. Caroline Fourest, one of those involved in the violence, also filed a complaint.

== Publications ==
Civitas publishes a quarterly review entitled Civitas – Revue catholique des questions politiques et sociales ("Civitas – Catholic review of political and social questions"). It publishes news about the movement and analyses the day's major political themes.
