= Law 2013-404 =

Same-sex marriage legislation in France

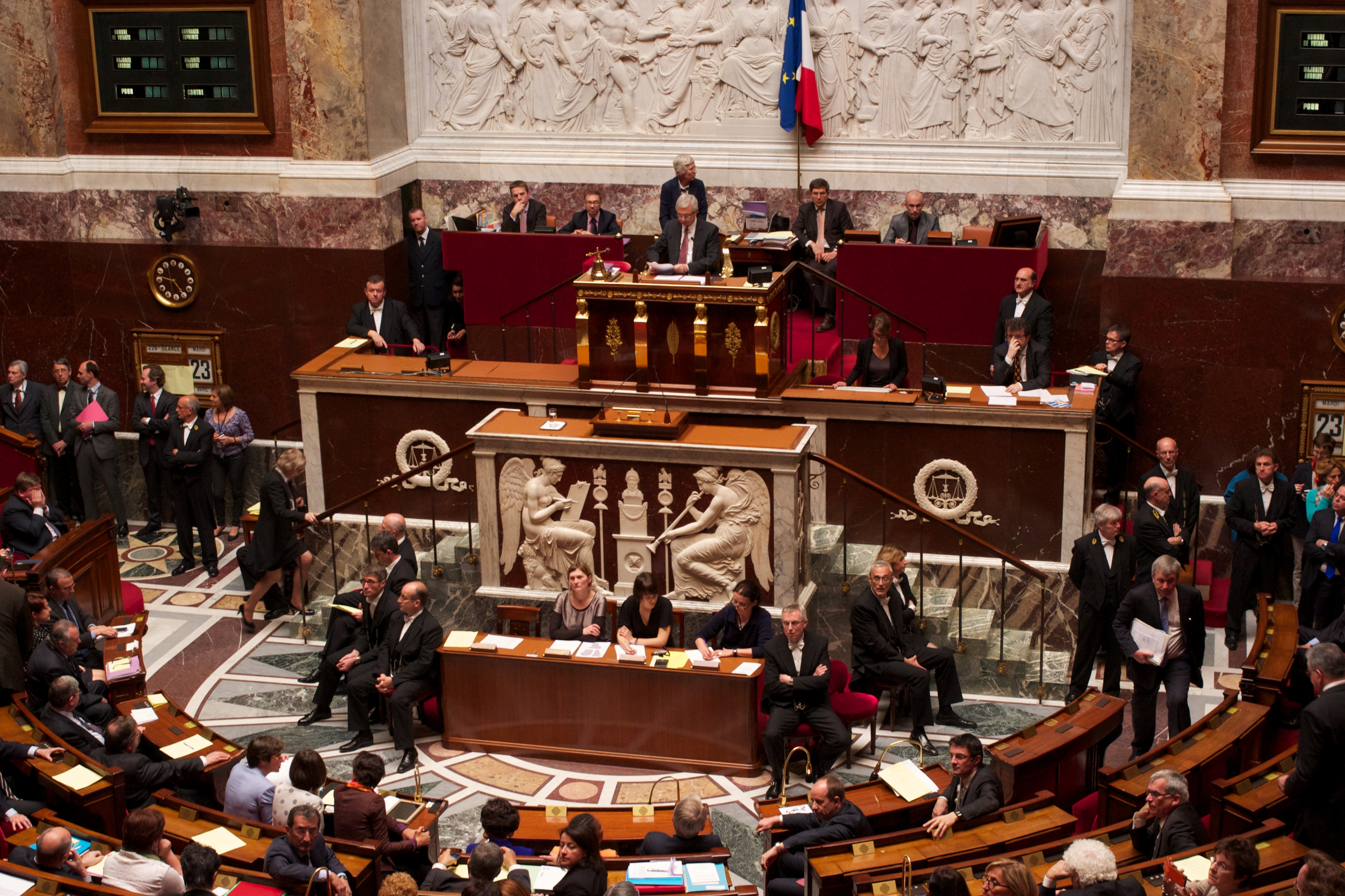
- The National Assembly on 23 April 2013 approving the amended bill, in a 331–225 vote.

Parliament of France
- Long title: The law opening marriage to same-sex couples, no. 2013-404 (French: Loi n° 2013-404 du 17 mai 2013 ouvrant le mariage aux couples de personnes de même sexe)
- Citation: ACT No. 2013-404 of 17 May 2013
- Territorial extent: French Republic
- Passed by: Parliament of France
- Passed: 23 April 2013
- Signed by: President François Hollande
- Signed: 17 May 2013
- Commenced: 29 May 2013

Legislative history
- Bill title: Bill no. 344 (French: Projet de loi n° 344)
- Bill citation: Bill no. 344
- Introduced by: Christiane Taubira
- Committee report: Social Affairs Committee Report
- Status: In force

The law opening marriage to same-sex couples, no. 2013-404 (French: Loi n° 2013-404 du 17 mai 2013 ouvrant le mariage aux couples de personnes de même sexe), commonly referred to as the Taubira law (French: Loi Taubira) after the Justice minister who introduced it, is a French law which, since 18 May 2013, grants same-sex couples the right to marry and jointly adopt children.

It was first introduced to the National Assembly of France on 7 November 2012 as Bill no. 344 (French: Projet de loi n° 344). On 12 February 2013, the National Assembly approved the bill in a 329–229 vote. The Senate approved the full bill with a 171–165 majority on 12 April with minor amendments. On 23 April, the National Assembly approved the amended bill, in a 331–225 vote, and following approval of the law by the Constitutional Council of France, it was signed into law by President François Hollande on 17 May and published in the Journal Officiel on 18 May 2013, with the first marriages under the law scheduled for 29 May.

== Background ==
=== Prior to 2012 ===
Same-sex marriage was an issue in the 2007 French presidential election, with the Conservative UMP opposing it and the Socialist Party supporting it, though both candidates supported civil unions. LGBT organizations in France, who believed that the prohibition of same-sex marriage was contrary to the law, asked the country's Constitutional Council to examine the constitutionality of same-sex marriage and to review the articles of the Civil Code. On 28 January 2011, the Constitutional Court of France decided that the law as it stood was constitutional, with same-sex marriage being a question for Parliament.

On 14 June 2011, the National Assembly voted 293-222 against a bill legalizing same-sex marriage, introduced by Socialist Party deputy Patrick Bloche. Most deputies of the majority party Union for a Popular Movement voted against the measure, while deputies of the Socialist Party mostly voted in favor. Members of the Socialist Party stated that legalization of same-sex marriage would become a priority should they gain a majority in the 2012 legislative election.

=== 2012 general election ===
During his campaign for the 2012 presidential election, Socialist Party candidate François Hollande declared his support for same-sex marriage and adoption for LGBT couples, and included them as one of his 60 government commitments. On 6 May 2012, Hollande won the election and promised to pass same-sex marriage legislation before spring 2013. A month later, Prime Minister Jean-Marc Ayrault announced that "Marriage and adoption laws for same-sex couples will be done quickly". On 17 June, Hollande's party won an absolute majority in the French Assembly, which was followed by an announcement by the government spokesperson Najat Vallaud-Belkacem on Pride Day that the marriage equality law would be adopted in spring 2013 at the latest. On 3 July, in his first speech in front of the newly elected assembly, Prime Minister Ayrault announced that marriage and adoption for everybody will be a reality "in the first semester of 2013". In August 2012, Prime Minister Ayrault announced that a bill to legalize same-sex marriage would be introduced to the National Assembly and the Senate in October 2012.

== Legislative history ==
The draft bill was submitted to parliament on 7 November 2012, by justice minister, Christiane Taubira. In its explanatory memorandum, the government noted that "marriage is traditionally defined as a formal legal act by which man and woman establish a union and civil law regulates the conditions, effects and dissolution" but that "the idea of opening marriage to same sex couples has risen steadily" since the adoption of civil unions and that "a new step must be taken". In an interview published the same day by the newspaper Sud Ouest, Taubira said that the bill would be "a reform of civilization".

The bill:

- does not change the current system of marriage – it instead makes the celebration possible between two persons of the same sex living in France;
- changes default arrangements with regard to surnames;
- opens the way for adoption by married same-sex couples, whether joint adoption or individual adoption;
- recognizes marriages between two people of the same sex performed abroad, including (retroactively) their children adopted legally in France or abroad;
- provides, when necessary, adaptations to the Civil Code and twelve other codes (Code of Criminal Procedure, Code of transport, etc.), as well as four other major laws (a 1945 ordinance on juvenile delinquency, a law on public hospitals, a law on public services, a law on public land). The words "father and mother" are replaced by the word "parent" and the words "husband and wife" with the word "spouse"; these changes do not apply to acts of civil status and family registers, as neither form is governed by law;
- authorizes the government to proceed in these adaptations as necessary, by means of simple (regulatory) ordinances, without requiring any new law, to modify these laws and regulations as necessary to fix their interpretation according to the main articles of the new bill (most of these adaptations will be in simple replacements of the terminology, or removal of articles fixing restrictions against same-sex parents).

The bill does not create any new right to have children, but it also does not extend, restrict or modify it further. All existing legal conditions and controls will apply to same-sex spouses equally to spouses of different sexes, or to single people. It also reaffirms (as agreed by the Constitutional Council) that parental civil relations are independent of the biological or natural conditions, simply because this has never been affirmed by existing laws during the Republic or by its current Constitution and preambules. Also it does not invalidate any existing international convention or treaty which may be applicable abroad.

In the National Assembly, the bill was returned to the Law Commission for which Erwann Binet was appointed rapporteur. On 14 November 2012, Marie-Françoise Clergeau was appointed rapporteur for the opinion of the Social Affairs Committee.

=== Legislative opposition ===
On 26 October 2012, the former prime minister and deputy of Paris François Fillon (UMP) stated that his party would repeal the law, if it wins the next election. Valérie Pécresse, also of the UMP, voiced the same position.

On 27 November 2012, during a debate on a law concerning terrorism, UMP deputy Nicolas Dhuicq linked the bill on same-sex marriage, homosexual parenting and terrorism. This statement was condemned by government spokesman Najat Belkacem-Vallaud. The next day, in the context of a question to the government, Marc Le Fur (UMP) stated that legalized adoption for gay couples would mean that for some "the child is simply a commodity" and that the government means "to impose by force" the law. Dominique Bertinotti, minister for the family, considered that these words "do not honor" the member and replied: "At the time of PACS, you proclaimed the end of the world. The end of the world did not occur"."

=== Law Commission hearings and debates ===
The Law Commission held weekly hearings on same-sex marriage from November 2012. It heard evidence from countries already having opened up marriage to same-sex couples, representatives of institutions, anthropologists, philosophers, doctors, lawyers and LGBT families. Associations opposed to the bill, however, disputed the method of rapporteur, Erwann Binet.

On 6 December 2012, Nicolas Gougain, spokesman of Inter-LGBT, denounced insinuations during his hearing before the committee that "because you are gay parents, you are potentially dangerous to your children because of the company you keep".

On 13 December 2012, at a hearing before the Judiciary Committee of the National Assembly, the Defender of Rights (ombudsman), Dominique Baudis, said that the text "puts an end to situations of inequality or indirect discrimination" and gives children raised by a homosexual couple "a legal status preferable to the current situation," while expressing reservations "on the method of preparation of bill". "Although parental marital situations and all spouses [...] are not identical in all respects, the project seeks to confuse", "the result of this confusion may be many legal uncertainties harmful" to "all children".

On 15 and 16 January, the debate in the Law Commission went over the text of the bill, including an amendment by the rapporteur Erwann Binet to Article 4 of the draft stating that the provisions of the Civil Code apply to "same-sex parents when referring to the father and mother" and not to grandparents.

=== Discussion session ===
The floor debate began on 29 January 2013. 5362 amendments were filed, mostly by right-wing opposition groups, which brought the bill to "among the top 10 bills with the largest number of amendments in 30 years", the record being held by left-wing parliamentary groups with 137,655 amendments to the law on energy which privatized Gaz de France in 2006. The referendum motion filed by 60 members was dismissed on 30 January 2013 by 298 votes against 184, and the amendment of the conscience clause was rejected on February 2 by 244 votes against 101.

On 2 February 2013, the National Assembly approved Article 1 of the bill, which defines marriage as a union between two people regardless of the gender of the partners, by 249 votes against 97. On 12 February 2013, the National Assembly approved the bill as a whole in a 329-229 vote.

Results of the first vote in the National Assembly
Parliamentary group	For	Against	Abstaining	Vote total
Socialist, Republican & Citizen	283	4	5	292
Union for a Popular Movement Group	3	187	5	196
Union of Democrats and Independents Group	4	25	0	29
Ecologist Group	17	0	0	17
Radical, Republican, Democratic and Progressist	13	2	0	15
Democratic and Republican Left	9	4	0	13
Non-Attached	0	7	0	7
TOTAL	329	229	10	568

=== Senate ===
Following the National Assembly's approval, the Senate has to consider the bill. On 20 March, the Law Committee of the Senate advanced the bill by a 23-21 vote. The full Senate has been considering the bill since 4 April. The Senate rejected a motion that would have put the issue before voters in a national referendum.

The Senate approved the full bill with a 171-165 majority on 12 April with minor amendments.

=== Second National Assembly vote ===
The National Assembly adopted to vote on the bill without further amendment, meaning that, if approved, the text would become definitive. It approved the bill as amended by the Senate on 23 April 2013, in a 331-225 vote, with ten abstentions. Shortly before the vote, protesters opposing the law were ejected from the Assembly as they tried to unfurl a banner.

Results of the second vote in the National Assembly
Parliamentary group	For	Against	Abstaining	Vote total
Socialist, Republican & Citizen	281	4	4	289/292
Union for a Popular Movement Group	6	183	5	194/196
Union of Democrats and Independents Group	5	25	0	30/30
Ecologist Group	17	0	0	17/17
Radical, Republican, Democratic and Progressist	13	2	0	15/16
Democratic and Republican Left	9	4	1	14/15
Non-Attached	0	7	0	7/8
TOTAL	331	225	10	566/575

The announcement of the result was met with cheers and chants of "égalité" from supporters of the bill in the parliamentary chamber. In a speech following the vote, justice minister Christiane Taubira, who had authored the bill, expressed her "pride", saying: "Those who are opposed today will surely be surprised to be overcome with emotion at the happiness of the married couples".

=== Constitutional Council challenge ===
A challenge to the bill was immediately filed with the Constitutional Council by its parliamentary opponents in the UMP. They cited insufficient consultation with religious leaders, incompatibility with the Convention on the Rights of the Child, and the passage of the bill without a referendum. They also challenged a provision in the bill allowing employees, regardless of sexuality, to refuse deployment to a country where there would be a risk to the safety of an openly gay person, on the grounds that this could not be exercised without implicitly "coming out", contrary to the right to a private life contained in Article 8 of the European Convention on Human Rights. A provision denying the automatic right of a sperm donor to lesbian parents to be named in official documents was also challenged. According to the legal experts there was little chance of preventing the passage of the bill on these grounds, and the president of the Constitutional Council, Jean-Louis Debré, had himself already ruled the possibility out.

On 17 May 2013, the Court ruled that the bill is constitutional.

=== Promulgation ===
On 17 May 2013, the law was promulgated by President François Hollande, and published in the Journal officiel de la République française (JORF) the next day. On 24 May, the government issued the decree implementing the law. It was published in the official journal on 28 May 2013.

The city hall of Montpellier announced on 18 May that it had already accepted to preregister a marriage (using the publication of the passed law in the JORF to justify this), without waiting for application decrets, so that the first same-sex marriage in France (between two men) was celebrated and signed on 29 May.

== Scope ==
Initially, the act did not apply to nationals of Algeria, Bosnia and Herzegovina, Cambodia, Kosovo, Laos, Montenegro, Morocco, Poland, Serbia, Slovenia or Tunisia since, according to the Ministry of Justice memo, it would breach bilateral agreements that stipulate the law of that state applies rather than French law. On 28 January 2015, the Court of Cassation found those provisions discriminatory and contrary to French law so there are no longer limitations on binational same-sex couples getting married.

== Public reaction ==
=== Opposition marches ===
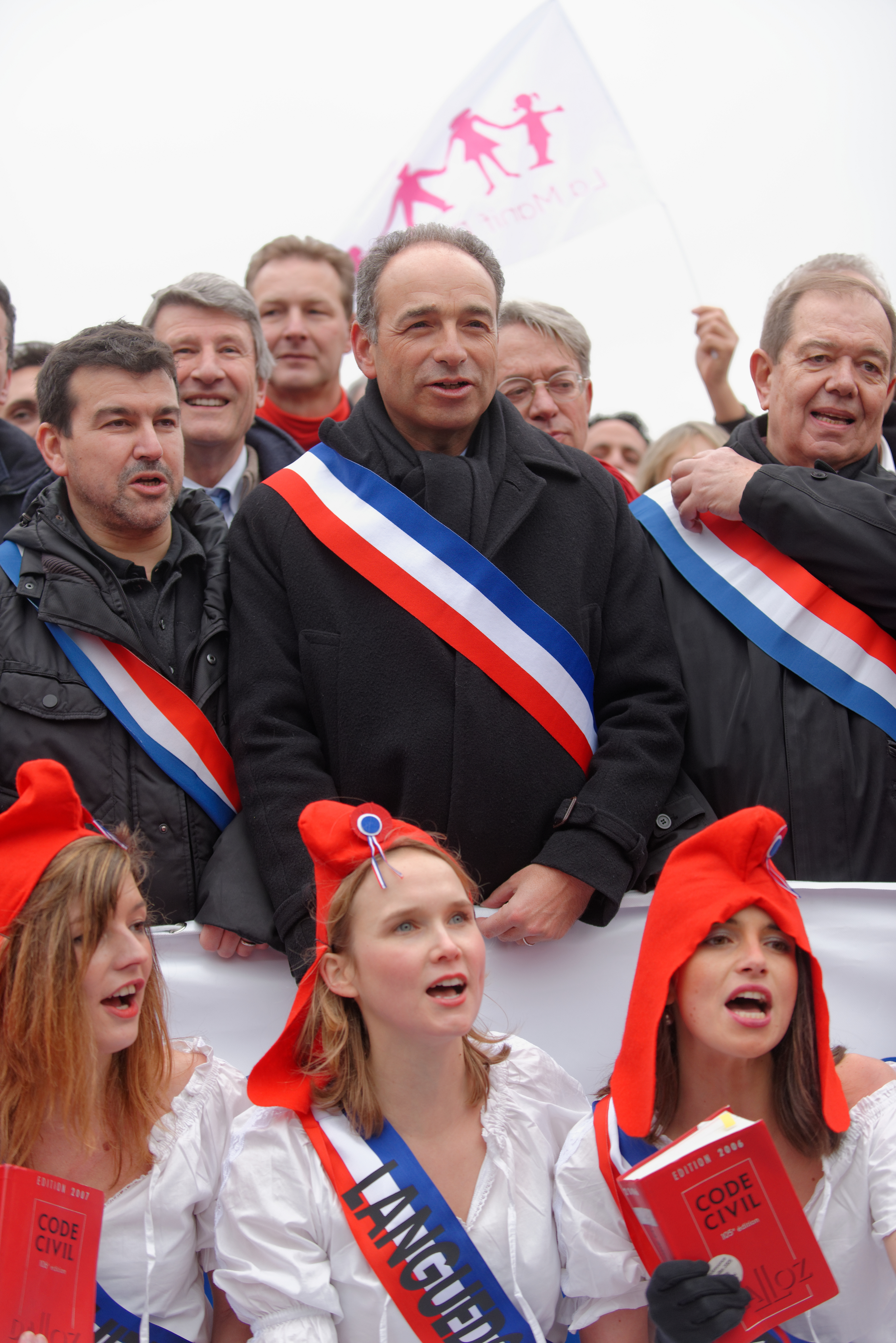
Jean-François Copé, Philippe de Villiers, Patrick Ollier rally against same-sex marriage, Paris, January 2013

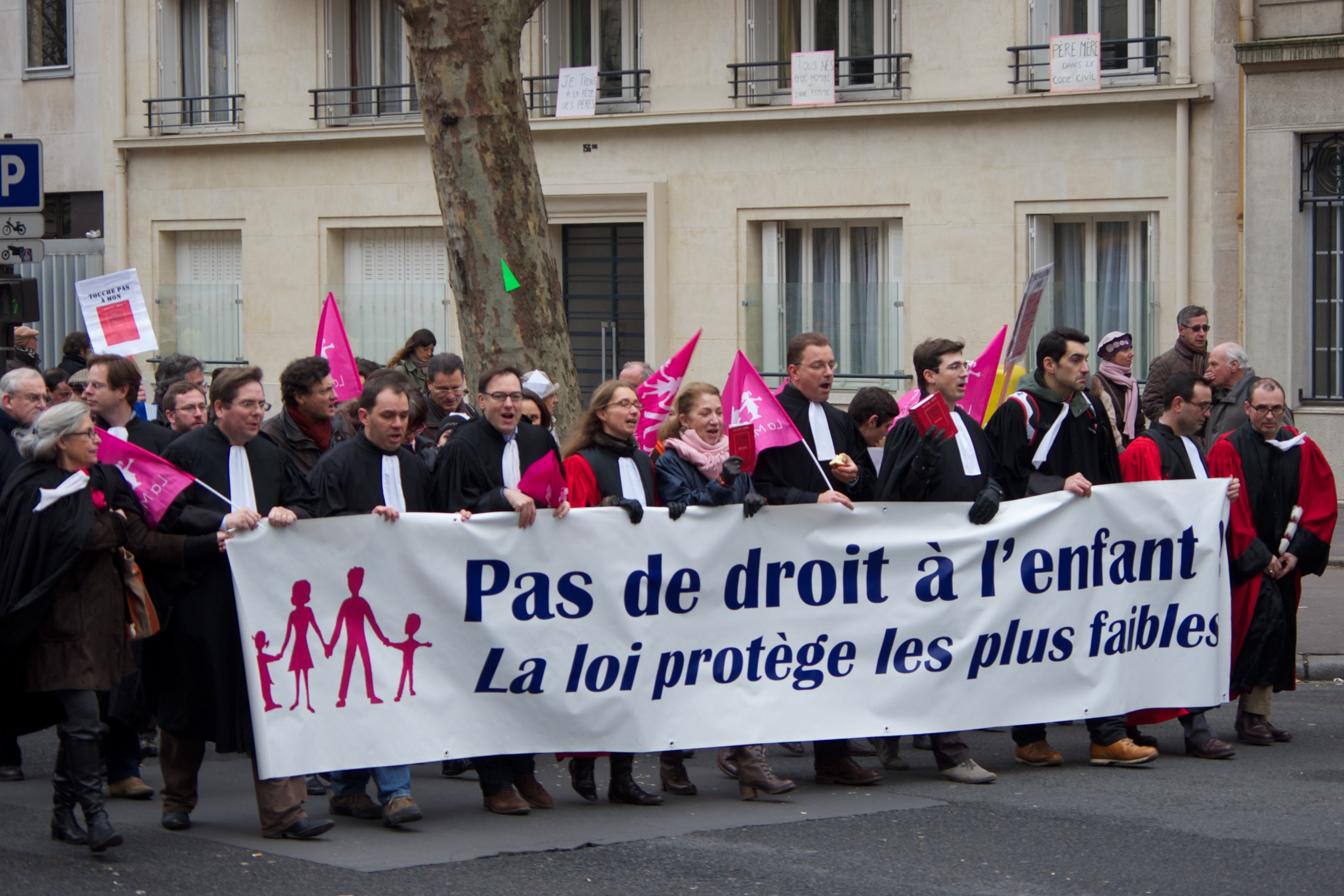
"Manif pour tous" rally against same-sex marriage, Paris, January 2013.

In January 2013, three big marches converged on the Champs de Mars, a large park next to the Eiffel Tower. Demonstrators carried placards with slogans such as: "We don't want your law, François" and "Don't touch my civil code". A French comedian and self-described "born-again Catholic", Frigide Barjot, led the march. She told French TV that same-sex marriage “makes no sense” because of the right of children to a mother and a father. The anti-same-sex marriage movement was led by Alliance VITA, a conservative anti-abortion organization founded by former deputy Christine Boutin.

This was among the largest demonstrations of any kind in Paris since 1984. Opponents include religious leaders (Catholic, some Protestant churches, Buddhists, Jews and Muslims), associations defending the rights of the children and families, atheists, and even a group of gay people against same-sex marriage.

Altercations between opposition protesters and police escalated on 24 March 2013, when protesters straying from the permitted route of opposition protests attempted to cross the police blockade of the Champs-Élysées, resulting in tear gas being used against the protesters to drive them back.

Following the announcement of the French parliament's vote results in early April 2013, those in opposition to the legalisation of same-sex marriage in France participated in public protests. In both Paris and Lyon, violence erupted as protesters clashed with police; the issue had also mobilised right-wing forces in the country, including neo-Nazis. In the wake of the results, Hollande stated: "I seek and I call on everyone to seek peace. That means understanding and respect. Because everything now needs to be concentrated on and devoted to what is essential: the economic success of our country and national cohesion."

On May 21, four days after the bill was passed, historian Dominique Venner committed suicide by shooting himself in the head with a shotgun inside the cathedral of Notre Dame de Paris. In several messages written before his suicide he described his suicide as a protest against the passage of the bill and as a rebellion "against pervasive individual desires that destroy the anchors of our identity, particularly the family, the intimate base of our multi-millennial society."

On 26 May 2013, opponents of the law staged another mass protest in Paris. French police estimated the number of protesters to be 150,000, while organisers claimed that one million were present. A total of 293 arrests were made and six people were injured during the demonstration, while up to 500 people began attacking the police following the march's conclusion. Several prominent politicians and activists were involved in the march, such as leader of the UMP party Jean-Francois Cope.

=== Support marches ===
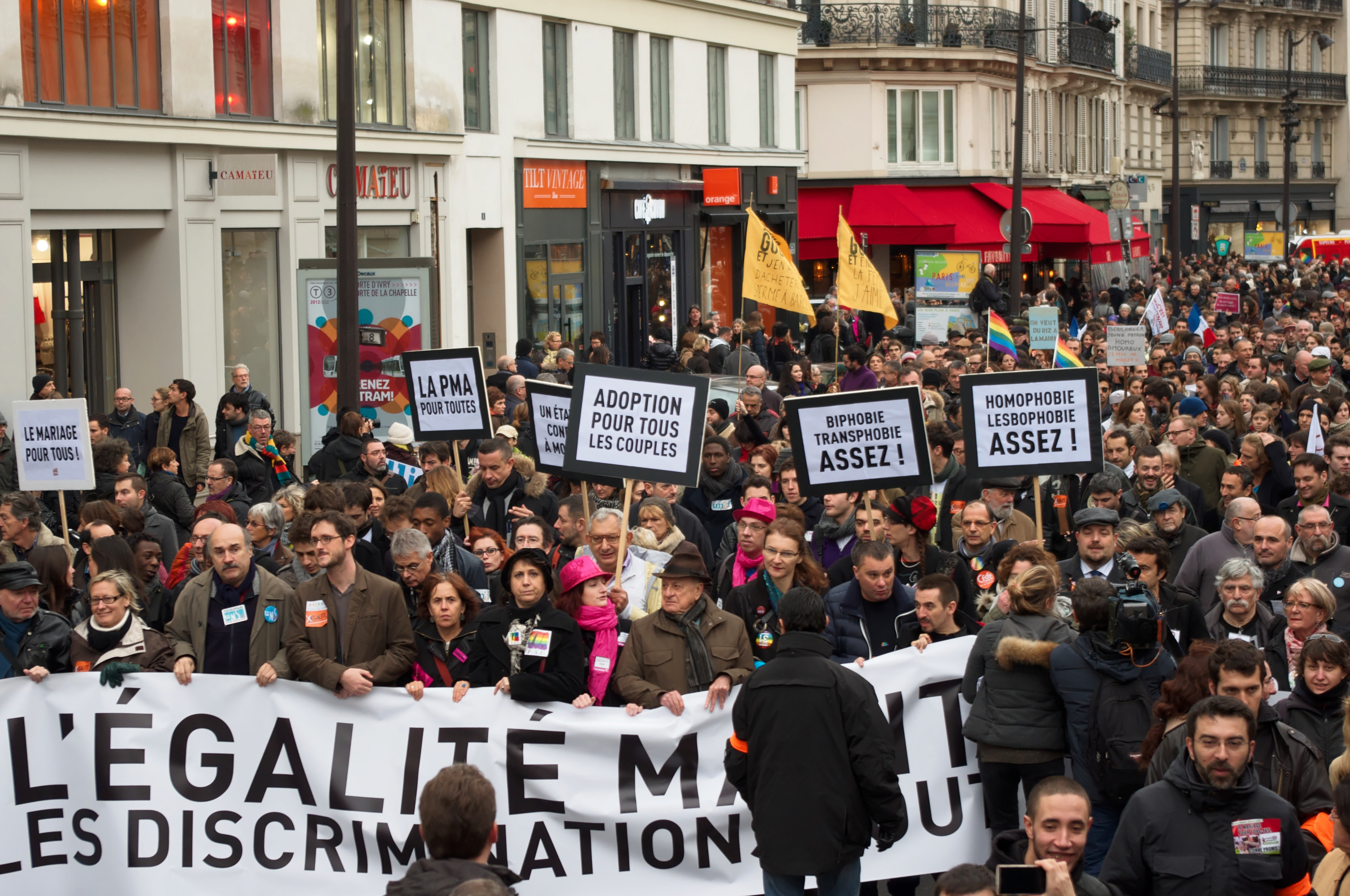
"Manif pour mariage pour tous" ("Rally for marriage for all"), rally in favor of same-sex marriage and adoption, 16 December 2012, Paris.

In reaction to the protests, the first major support march took place on 27 January 2013. According to the BBC, opponents have outnumbered supporters at recent demonstrations: between 340,000 and 800,000 people gathered in Paris on 13 January for a rally against same-sex marriage, compared to between 125,000 and 400,000 who turned out on Sunday to support the bill.

Demonstrators waved banners emblazoned with phrases like "Equality of rights is not a threat" and "Liberty, Equality, Fraternity. No more, no less!" Paris Mayor Bertrand Delanoë, who is openly gay, said on French television: "There is a big difference between today's march and the one two weeks ago, which is that this demonstration is one of brotherhood, not of hatred." and later added that "The majority of French people wants all couples to have equality in love and parenthood."

==== Endorsements of the bill ====
- The magazine Le Nouvel Observateur is in favor of opening marriage for everyone and launch an editorial entitled "In marriage for all, we say yes".
- More than 250 artists and television hosts, including Michel Sardou, committed in favor of marriage and adoption for homosexuals.
- Celebrities including Jenifer, Emmanuel Moire, Lorie and Marianne James, endorse "marriage for all" and are photographed with a sign that reads: "Marriage, adoption, paternity and LDC ... Yes to equality. Stop Homophobia.".
- Singer Shy'm expressed her support on the eve of a 27 January 2013 concert and kissed one of her female-dancers live on TF1.
- A public benefit soiree for same-sex marriage was held at the Théâtre du Rond-Point on 27 January 2013, at the initiative of Pierre Bergé and hosted by Laurence Ferrari. Among the attendees were Olivier Poivre d'Arvor, Jack Lang, Jean-Michel Ribes, Cyril Hanouna, Xavier Niel, Delphine Arnault, Guillaume Durand, Emma de Caunes and Mathieu Boogaerts. Manuel Valls read a letter of support for the initiative from the President of Argentina, Cristina Kirchner. Louis Schweitzer, Caroline Fourest, Jean-Pierre Mignard of Christian Witness and Bernard-Henri Lévy also headlined the event.
- The Grand Orient de France, the leading Continental Freemasonic body in France, stated its support for legalization in a press release, which also condemned the Roman Catholic Archbishop of Paris André Vingt-Trois for his public statements against it. In the statement, the GOdF described the bill as one which seeks to "ensure Republican recognition of free marital choice of individuals who wish it, in the name of equal rights". The statement included a call for all churches to restrict their activities to the purely spiritual, and not interfere with the democratic process. On the eve of the adoption of the bill, the Grand Orient further criticized religious leadership involvements in the protests against the bill and called for leaders of religious institutions to respect the separation of religion and state.

== See also ==
- Civil solidarity pact
- LGBT rights in France
