= Escada (disambiguation) =

Escada is a German designer clothing company. Escada may also refer to:

- Escada, Pernambuco, a city in northeastern Brazil
- Alain Escada (born 1970), Belgian far-right activist
