= Pierre-Guillaume de Roux =

French editor (1963–2021)

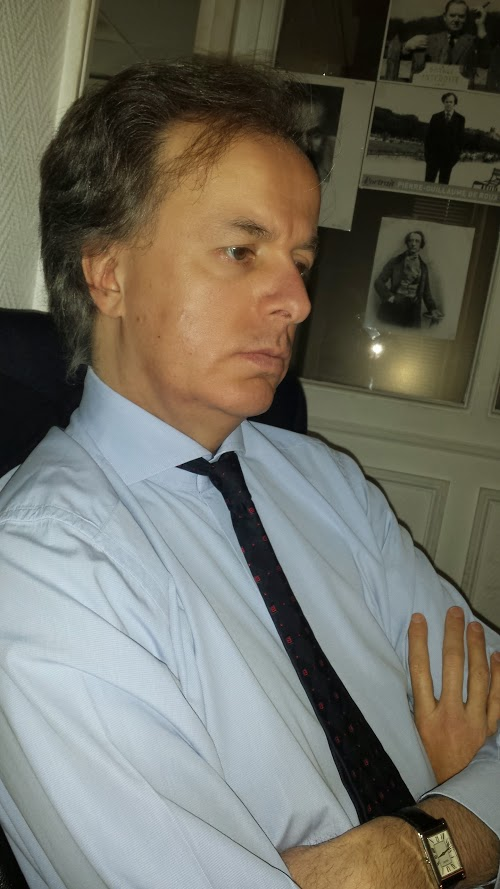
- de Roux in 2014
- Born: Pierre Guillaume Louis Ferdinand Marie Michel Gédéon de Roux; 25 February 1963; Paris, France
- Died: 11 February 2021 (aged 57); Paris, France
- Occupation: Editor

Pierre-Guillaume de Roux (25 February 1963 – 11 February 2021) was a French editor.

== Biography ==
Born in Paris on 25 February 1963, his full name was Pierre Guillaume Louis Ferdinand Marie Michel Gédéon de Roux. His parents were writer and editor Dominique de Roux and Jacqueline Brusset. Pierre-Guillaume was a member of the directing committee of the Société des lecteurs de Dominique de Roux.

De Roux started his career in 1982 with Christian Bourgois éditeur before becoming a producer with France Culture alongside Olivier Germain-Thomas. He collaborated with multiple publications such as Arthus, Contrepoint, Revue des deux Mondes, Latitudes, Le Quotidien de Paris, L'Appel, Magazine hebdo. In 1985, he was appointed literary director of Éditions de la Table ronde. In 1990, he was one of the founding members of Éditions Criterion of Média-Participations, where he would support the contemporary literary movement La Nouvelle Fiction. In 1992, he started working at Éditions Julliard, 25 years after his father had worked there. He then led the Cultural Affairs department within the City of Paris from 1994 to 1995 before becoming editorial director of Éditions Bartillat.

In 1999, de Roux voiced his opposition to the Kosovo War signing the "Europeans want peace" petition. That same year, he founded Éditions des Syrtes alongside Serge de Pahlen. He left the publishing house in 2001. He served as literary director of Éditions du Rocher from 2001 to 2006, and left the publisher fully in 2008 following a disagreement over his editorial policies. He also served as editorial director of Éditions Pascal Galodé.

In July 2010, de Roux founded Éditions Pierre-Guillaume de Roux, which focused on publishing essays and historical nonfiction, as well as French, Italian, and Hungarian literature. He labeled himself a "right-wing editor", and was leading shareholder for all years of its existence so far other than 2015, when Charles Beigbeder held the title.

Pierre-Guillaume de Roux died following a long illness on 11 February 2021 at the age of 57, fourteen days short from his 58th birthday.

== Authors published ==
- Charles Beigbeder
- Alain de Benoist
- Roland Dumas
- Jean-Paul Gourévitch
- Roland Jaccard
- Gilles Lapouge
- Ludovine de La Rochère
- Robert Ménard
- Richard Millet
- Robert Poujade
- Dominique Venner
- Jacques Vergès

== Decorations ==
- Knight of the Ordre des Arts et des Lettres (2007)
- Knight of the Order of the Star of Italy (2008)
