= Aliette Espieux =

French anti-abortion activist

Aliette Espieux (born 5 May 1999) is a French pro-life activist.

She has been the spokesperson for the March for Life since September 2019. She also has ties to the far right, including some radical groups, and notably ran as a candidate on a National Rally (RN) list in Lyon's 5th arrondissement during the 2020 municipal elections.

== Early life and education ==
Espieux was born on 5 May 1999, in Carpentras (Vaucluse), She is the youngest of thirteen children (eight sons and five daughters) of Bruno Espieux, a colonel in the French Air Force and Knight of the Legion of Honour, and his wife, Christine, née Cumunel.

A devout Catholic, like her parents, she discovered the opposition to abortion and euthanasia by attending several marches with her family during her childhood. She says she was particularly affected at the age of six by a rosary organized by the embryologist Xavier Dor (1929-2020), during which counter-protesters allegedly assaulted participants.

== Political Career ==
In 2019, she became spokesperson for the March for Life, a Catholic anti-abortion movement. She seeks to modernize and rejuvenate the movement..

In 2020, she supported the National Rally candidate Olivier Pirra in the municipal elections in Lyon's 5th arrondissement, appearing sixth on his "For the Love of Lyon" list.

She also volunteers with the Jérôme Lejeune Foundation and the NGO SOS Chrétiens d'Orient, and is close to several far-right organizations, notably Academia Christiana, for whom she gave a lecture in 2022.

During the 2022 presidential election, she supported Éric Zemmour before calling for a vote for Marine Le Pen.

In 2026, she filed the declaration for a march organized in Lyon in tribute to Quentin Deranque, a far-right activist who had died shortly before after a clash with anti-fascist activists.

== Professional Activity ==
Espieux holds a position as a communications intern for the online prayer platform Hozana, funded by billionaire Pierre-Édouard Stérin.

== Personal life ==
Since spring 2025, Espieux has been married to Eliot Bertin, leader of the neo-Nazi group Lyon Populaire, which was dissolved in 2025 for advocating collaboration with Nazism and inciting hatred against foreigners. Bertin is under investigation for conspiracy after leading an attack in November 2023 against a conference on Palestine, which injured six people. She sometimes campaigns alongside him..
