= La Manif pour tous =

Anti-LGBTQ organization in France

- La Manif pour tous
- Named after: Mariage pour tous
- Formation: November 2, 2012; 14 years ago
- Founder: Frigide Barjot, Albéric Dumont, Ludovine de La Rochère
- Founded at: Paris
- Type: Nonprofit organization
- Purpose: Promotion of traditional marriage and nuclear family. Opposition to same-sex marriage, adoption, and "gender ideology".
- Location: France, Finland, Italy, Germany
- Region served: Europe
- Methods: Protests, reports, policy proposals
- President: Ludovine de La Rochère
- Vice-president: Albéric Dumont
- Website: www.lamanifpourtous.fr (in French)

The Syndicat de la famille ('Union for the Family'), better known under its original name of La Manif pour tous (LMPT), is a nonprofit organization and political movement based in France which is responsible for most of the anti-gender movement and LGBTQ rights opposition demonstrations and actions that took place between 2012 and 2016, against the legalization of same-sex marriage in France (better known as mariage pour tous—"marriage for all"), as well as against the same-sex adoption in France.

Since the law was enacted in May 2013, the organization's demands have remained the same: opposition to marriage and adoption by same-sex couples, to assisted reproductive technology in the absence of a father for the child, and to all forms of gestational surrogacy (including for male-female couples). The movement supports father-mother-child filiation and opposes what they refer to as "gender ideology".

Described by Le Monde as bringing together numerous organizations, of which the main ones are almost all religious and mainly linked to Roman Catholicism, and supported in its calls for public demonstrations by many members of the right wing and the far-right in France, the group identified itself as apolitical and non-denominational before it became a political party itself in April 2015.

Internal divisions resulted in the successive departures of its founders Béatrice Bourges, Frigide Barjot, and Xavier Bongibault.

== Founding and name ==
The name La Manif pour tous means "Protest for all" and was named after the French expression Le mariage pour tous ("marriage for all") which was the popular term used in France to promote same sex marriage, and also to refer to the Civil solidarity pact (PaCS), the 1999 French law permitting civil union between same-sex partners. The organization formally changed its name in 2023.

== Goals and methods ==
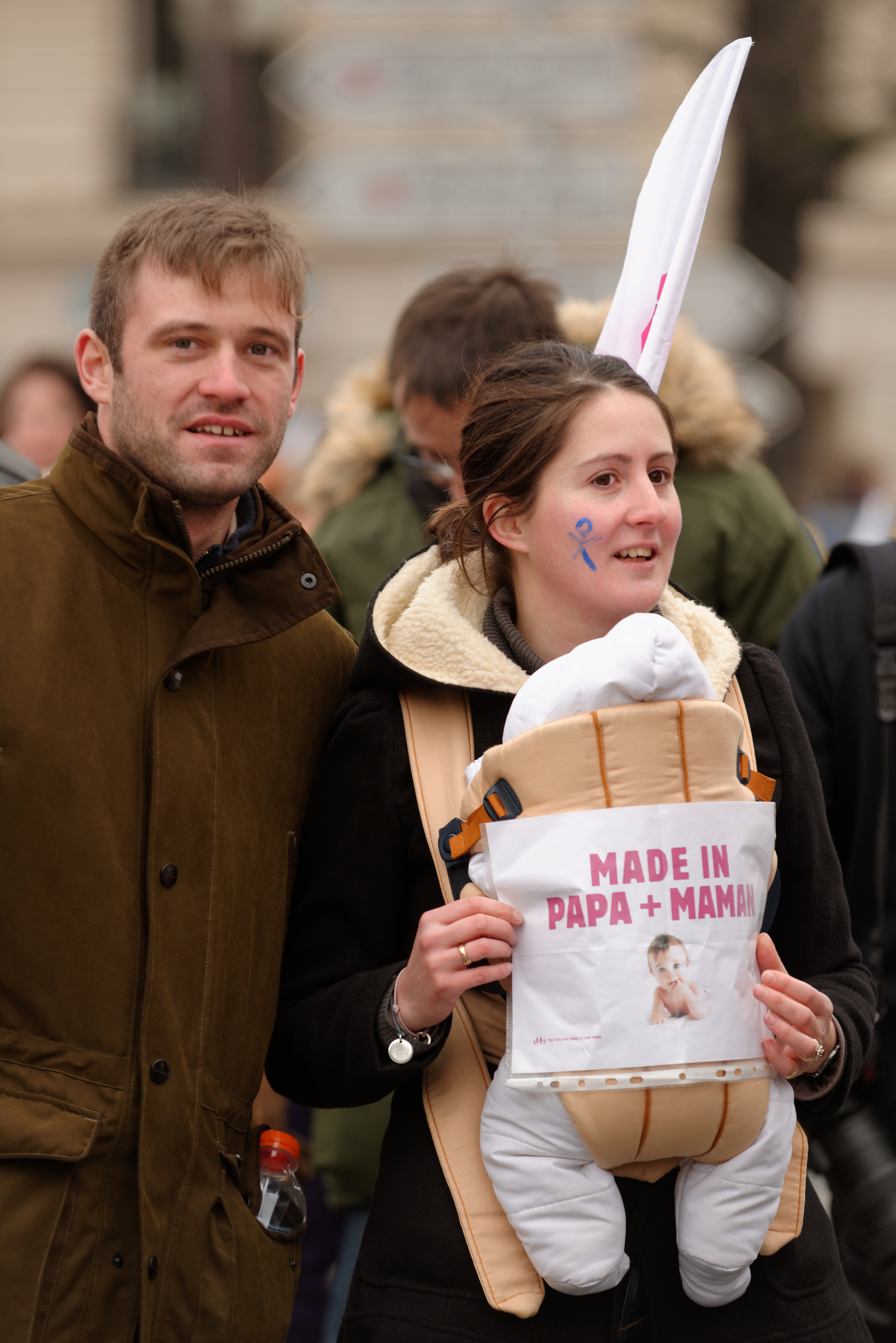
Paris demonstration on 13 January 2013 with a baby "Made in Papa and Mama".

Some of the objectives of La Manif pour tous include:

- demanding that the gay-marriage act be repealed,
- protesting against what they call the French government's "familyphobia",
- protesting against the government's alleged teaching of "gender theory" in French schools, or plans to impose sex education starting in kindergarten.

An organized group called for a boycott in 2014 involving pulling children from schools one day a month to protest against the alleged anti-family actions of the government.

Surrogacy is currently illegal in France for everyone; In vitro fertilization and other birth-assistive technology is available, but only to heterosexual couples. The government says it has no plans to change the situation, and Prime Minister Manuel Valls declared his opposition to surrogacy in all forms. Regarding "gender theory" or sex education in pre-schools the government says they are false rumors created on purpose by conservatives with ties to far-right groups.

== Transformation into political party ==
After having long presented itself as an "apolitical organization", La Manif Pour Tous officially transformed itself into a political party on 24 April 2015. However, they denied any intention of fielding candidates in elections, and described their change in status as simply a "technical decision". According to analysts, the change was actually motivated by financial considerations, as donors to political groups automatically benefit from substantial tax deductions.

In March 2023, the organization changed its name to Syndicat de la famille ('Union for the Family'). Ludovine de La Rochère shared the presidency with Albéric Dumont, former general coordinator of La Manif pour tous, and whose private security company, Ultreïa, was a service provider to right-wing French presidential candidate Éric Zemmour's campaign.

== Expansion in Europe ==
La Manif pour Tous inspired the creation of branches of the French organization or similar, unaffiliated groups in other European countries:

- in Croatia, LMPT inspired formation of In the name of the family, led by Vincent John Batarelo;
- Italy,
- Finland, under the name Genuine Marriage Citizens' Initiative;
- Demo für Alle (Protest for All) in Germany;;
- in Russia, Vladimir Putin's political party adopted the group's emblem to create a new "heterosexual flag".

== Criticism ==
La Manif pour tous has been criticized as homophobic and using children to make a political point.

== See also ==
- Anti-gender movement
- Catholic Church and homosexuality
- Catholic Church in France
- Christian views on marriage
- Civitas (movement)
- Coalition pour la vie et la famille
- Feminism in France
- Gender roles in Christianity
- Human rights in France
- Intersex rights in France
- LGBTQ adoption in Europe
- LGBTQ culture in Paris
- LGBTQ history in France
- LGBTQ rights in Europe
- LGBTQ rights in France
- LGBTQ rights in the European Union
- List of Christian denominational positions on homosexuality
- Marriage in the Catholic Church
- Right-wing politics
- Same-sex marriage in France
