= Beatrice Bourges =

French activist

Béatrice Marie Bourges
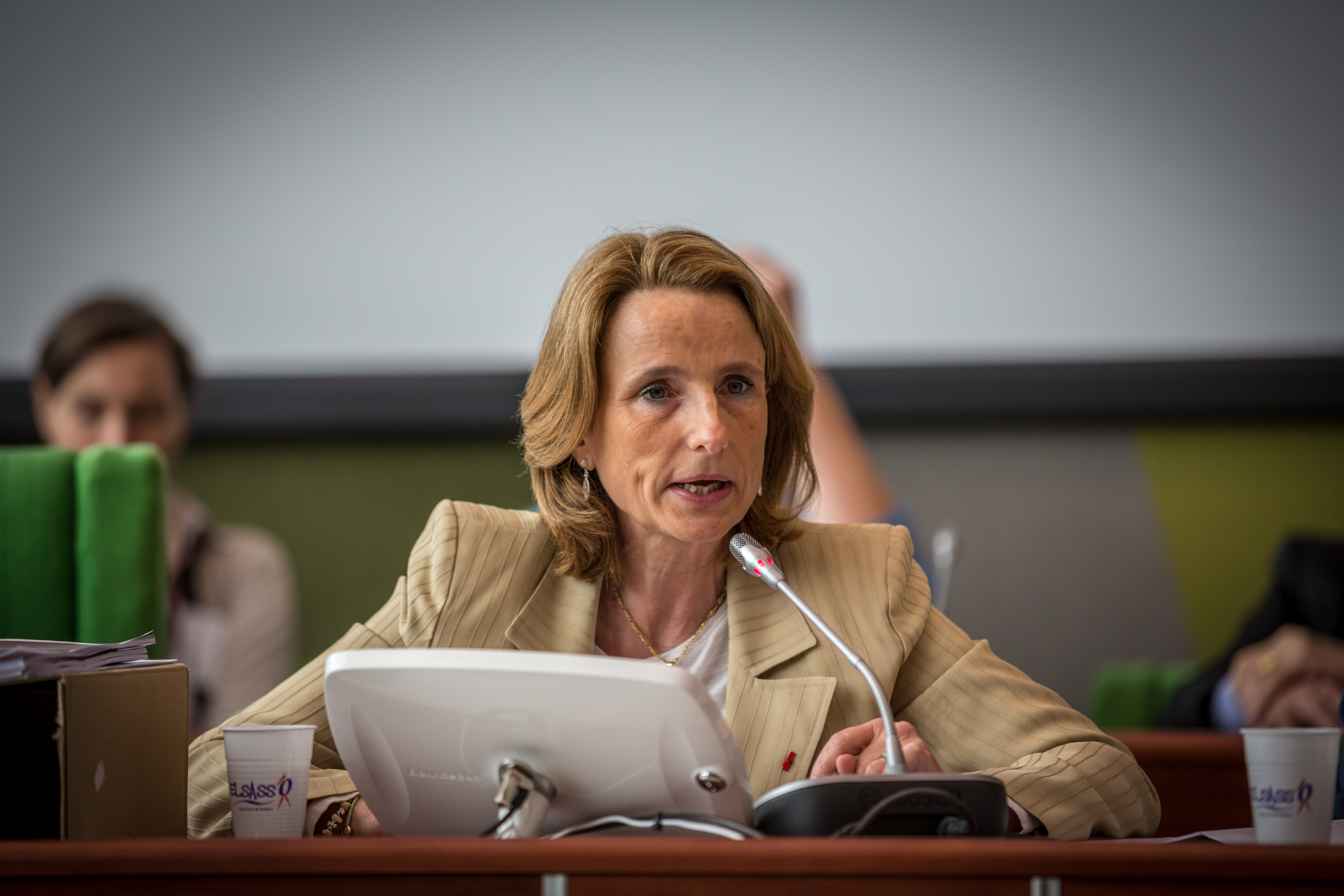
- Béatrice Bourges at the Council of Europe in Strasbourg, 26 June 2013
- Born: Béatrice Marie Morel; October 18, 1960 (age 65)
- Occupations: Management consultant and activist

Béatrice Bourges, born Béatrice Morel on 18 October 1960 in Algeria, is a French management consultant and anti-gay marriage activist. She is a chevalier de la Legion d'Honneur and describes herself as the spokeswoman for Printemps Français ("French Spring"), a pressure group advocating civil disobedience and passive resistance to bring about the end of same-sex marriage in France. In 2013, she was described by Manuel Valls, then the French Minister of the Interior, as "the most dangerous woman in France."

She is a founding member of La Manif pour tous, a less confrontational anti-gay marriage organization, from which she was excluded in 2013. She argues that gay marriage is a product of an American-led international programme to undermine the concept of gender which she describes as "the fundamental building blocks of humanity."

She is a Catholic mother of two, and has divorced and remarried.
