= Xavier Dor =

French embryologist (1929–2020)

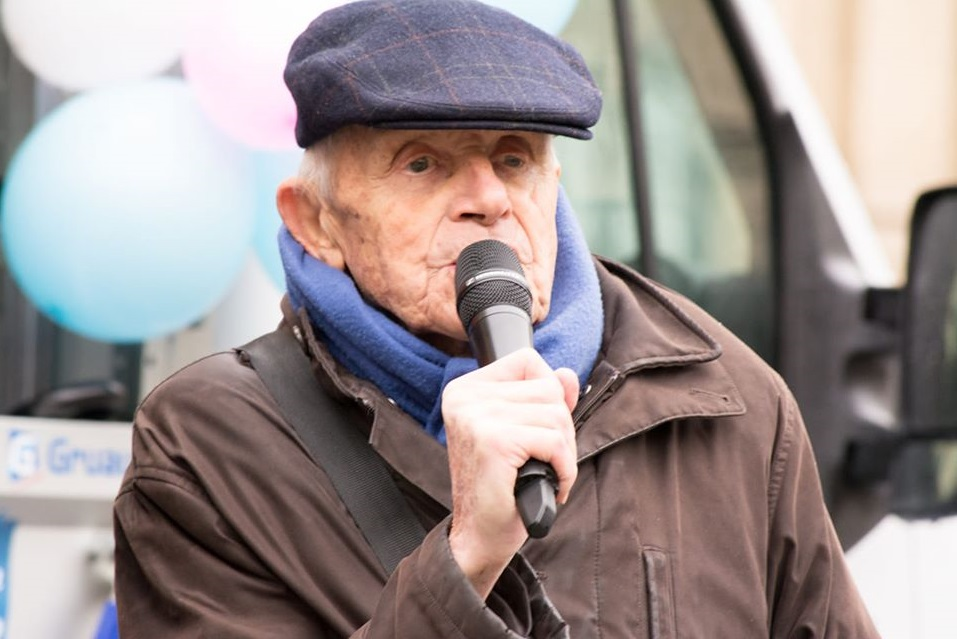
- Dor in 2019
- Born: 30 January 1929; Marseille, France
- Died: 4 April 2020 (aged 91); Paris, France
- Occupation: Embryologist

Xavier Dor (30 January 1929 – 4 April 2020) was a French embryologist, known for his activism against abortions.

== Personal life ==
Dor was born into a Catholic family. His father was the director of the Compagnie Générale Transatlantique. He had four children with his wife, Françoise Dugé de Bernonville, daughter of Jacques de Bernonville. Dor was a doctor specializing in embryology and practiced at the Pitié-Salpêtrière Hospital in Paris. He was also a researcher in cardiac embryology at Inserm and a lecturer at Pierre and Marie Curie University. Dor died on 4 April 2020 in Paris from COVID-19 at age 91 during the pandemic.

== Anti-abortion activism ==
Dor was the founder and president of the SOS tout-petits association. He often led protests in front of hospitals which carried out abortions. He participated in several dozen of these protests.

According to Neil Datta, leader of the European Parliamentary Forum for Sexual & Reproductive Rights, Dor was the French representative of the first generation anti-abortion activists, who appeared in the 1980s and 90s after Western countries such as France, the United States, and Germany legalized abortion. This movement did not achieve its ultimate goal, which was to overturn the legalization of abortion; but Dor said "even on my deathbed, I will continue" his fight against abortion.

Dor took part in the March for Life in Paris on 22 January 2017. He stayed at Denfert-Rochereau at the end of the march, leading a prayer to the Virgin Mary. He was joined by Alain Escada and a priest in taking part in the prayer. He left SOS tout-petits in January 2018. He was succeeded by Dr. Philippe Piloquet, an embryologist at the University of Nantes.

== Legal issues ==
Dor was charged with eleven different crimes throughout his life, most of which coming after the Neiertz Law passed in 1993, which made obstruction of abortion a crime.

In 2014, he was charged with "moral and psychological pressure" on a woman who was planning on terminating her pregnancy by giving her knitted slippers and a medal representing the Virgin Mary. The Court of Appeal of Paris acquitted him of these crimes, and fined him €10,000 for obstructing abortion, €5,000 of which was suspended.

== Books ==
- Le Crime contre Dieu (1998) ISBN 2-911005-14-7
- Le Livre blanc de l'avortement en France, chap 8, collectif 30 ans, ça suffit (2006)
