= Ludovine de La Rochère =

French anti-LGBTQ activist (born 1971)

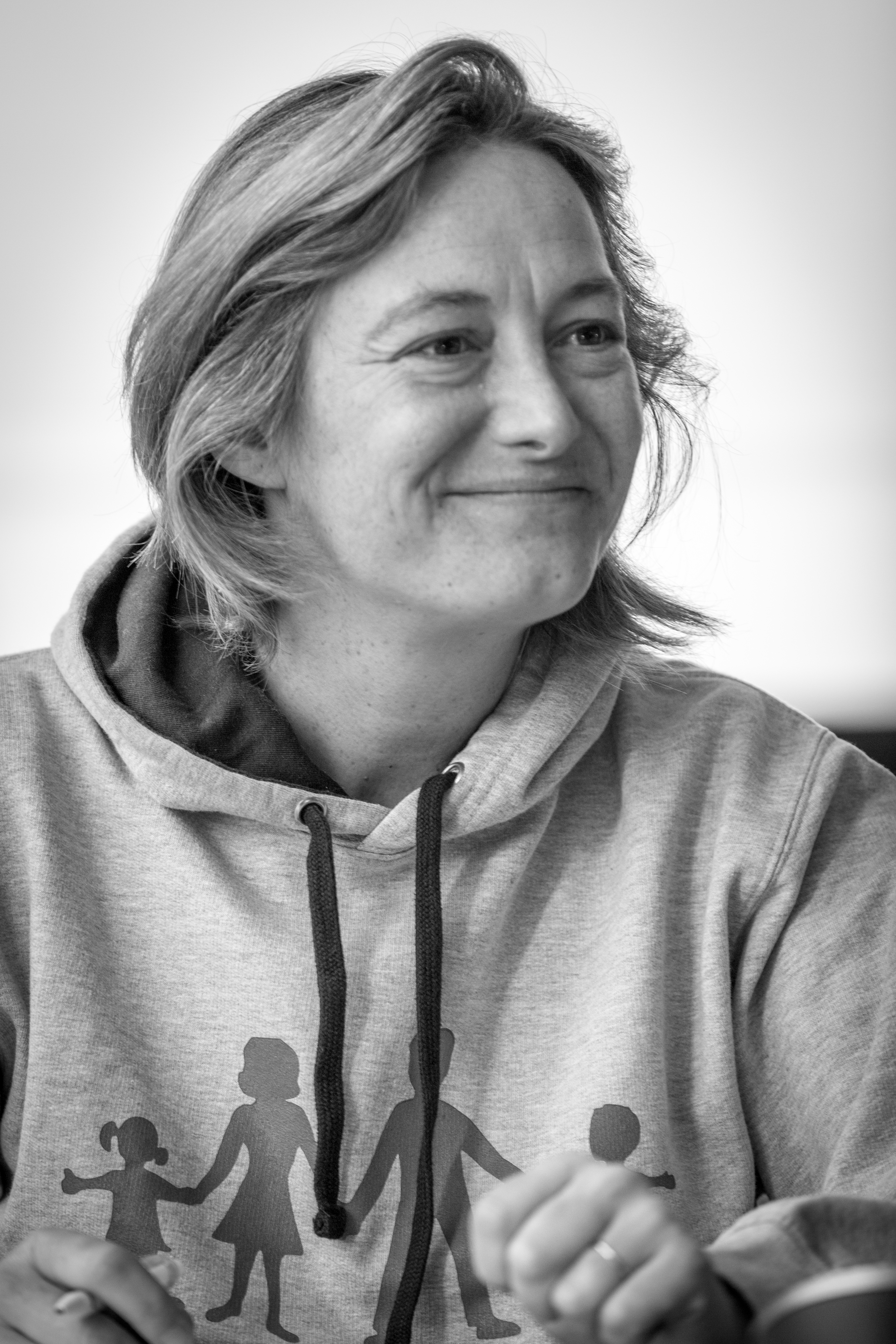
Ludovine de la Rochère in 2013

Ludovine de La Rochère (born 17 January 1971) is a French anti-LGBTQ activist. She is president and co-founder of La Manif pour tous.

== Biographical information ==
=== Personal life ===
Ludovine de la Rochère was brought up in Paris. She is a practicing Catholic, but attended non-religious public school. She went on to obtain a degree in medieval history. She then taught geography at a secondary school in Essonne, before quitting teaching in the 1990s.

Ludovine de la Rochère was described as having "traditional religious convictions" by a former boss. She was married by 21 and had her first child at age 23. She has four children.

=== La Manif pour tous ===
In 2003, de la Rochère joined the communications team of the Bishops' Conference of France, where she met Frigide Barjot. Together, they and Albéric Dumont decided to found La Manif pour tous to fight against a law enabling same-sex couples to get married in France. Before this, de la Rochère had only ever protested once before, and was described as someone who "showed no interest in political activism". After internal disagreements, Frigide Barjot left the group and de la Rochère took over as spokesperson for the movement. She has described La Manif pour tous as an "apolitical, non-denominational and non-homophobic" movement.

=== Political views ===
Ludovine de la Rochère is opposed to same-sex marriage and civil partnerships between same-sex couples. She has stated publicly that "two people of the same sex cannot create a family together". In 2014, de la Rochère falsely claimed that 90% of female same-sex couples and 70% of male same-sex couples in Belgium end up getting divorced.

De la Rochère has voiced her opposition to surrogacy, comparing it to a "modern version of trafficking". She believes that men and women are "equal and different", and has denounced the "gender ideology", which she claims has made children confused about their gender identity. She also more recently opposed the extension of assisted reproductive technology to single women and lesbian couples.
