= Bill 586 =

Bill 586, introduced by Patrick Bloche, was the first bill on same-sex marriage that was voted on by the parliament in France. It followed the decision of the Constitutional Council to let the legislature decide on this issue. The Socialist Party took advantage of a legislative window to put the text to the agenda. On 14 June 2011, the National Assembly of France voted 293–222 against the bill.

== Votes ==
Group	Political field	Yes	No	Abstain	Important votes
UMP	Right-wing	9	269	9	Axel Poniatowski (Chairman of the Foreign Affairs Committee) : YES - Jean-Louis Borloo (radical (centrist) candidate in the 2012 French presidential election) : YES - Christian Jacob (Chairperson of the Presidential Majority (UMP / NC)) : NO
PS	Left-wing	192	0	2	François Hollande (candidate in the 2012 French presidential election) : YES
NC	Centre-right Christian Democrats	1	20	0	Jean-Christophe Lagarde (Vice President of the National Assembly) : YES
GDR	Left-wing	20	0	2	Noël Mamère (Begles Mayor who delivered the first same-sex marriage in France invalidated by court some time later) : YES
NI	Others	0	4	3	François Bayrou (former Christian Democrat candidate in the presidential elections of 2002 and 2007 he claims to be favorable, but doubts the word "marriage".) : ABSTAIN
Total		222	293	16	
