= Coalition pour la vie et la famille =

Former anti-abortion European political party

Coalition for Life and Family Coalition pour la vie et la famille
- Abbreviation: CPVF
- Chairman: Alain Escada
- General secretary: François-Xavier Peron
- Founded: 5 September 2016
- Headquarters: Av Wielemans Ceuppens 56, 1190 Forest, Brussels, Belgium
- Ideology: Social conservatism Political Catholicism; Nationalism; Reactionarism
- Political position: Far-right

Website
- www.coalitionlifeandfamily.com (archived)

The Coalition for Life and Family or Coalition pour la vie et la famille (fr, CPVF) was a European political party that focused on opposing abortion and promoting traditional family values against homosexuality. In 2016, the party applied for and received public funding from the European Union for the year 2017; however, in 2017, it did not register with the newly created Authority for European political parties and European political foundations.

The main activity of the CPVF is carried by the French organisation Civitas. Civitas has acted as a party since April 2016. Civitas can be categorised as arch-conservative Catholic nationalist, and far-right. The party is close to the Society of Saint Pius X. The party chairman is the Belgian Alain Escada, who is also chairman of Civitas. Civitas member François-Xavier Peron is the co-founder of CPVF. In France, Civitas and Escada cooperate closely with the convicted holocaust denier Jean-Marie Le Pen and the Parti de la France.

CPVF has no members in the European Parliament, but members in the national and regional parliaments of Austria, Greece, Italy, Latvia, Lithuania, Poland, Spain and Slovakia. Surprisingly, CPVF's former Latvian member, Mihails Zemļinskis is a member of Social Democratic Party "Harmony", while this party's only member of European Parliament, Andrejs Mamikins, sat with the Progressive Alliance of Socialists and Democrats group.

== See also ==
- European political party
- Authority for European Political Parties and European Political Foundations
- European political foundation
