= Étienne Fouilloux =

French university teacher (born 1941)

Etienne Fouilloux
- Born: 1941 (age 84–85)
- Known for: Christian Religious History

Etienne Fouilloux (born 1941) is a French university teacher primarily interested in the history of tensions within the twentieth century French Roman Catholic Church (but extending to other Christian traditions) and the contemporary publication of works of Christian antiquity.

== Career and background ==
He is currently emeritus and honorary professor of Lumière University Lyon 2 where he taught as Director of the André Latreille Centre of religious history (1990-2001), Fouilloux had previously worked at Paris-X Nanterre (1969-1981), Caen (1981-1990) Universities. In addition to French agrégé and doctorat qualifications he holds an honorary doctorate from the Catholic University of Louvain.

His interests include the modernist crisis in the early 20th century, dissensions within the French Catholic community between 1937 and 1947, and during the Algerian crisis. Publications also include biographies of the Jesuit François Varillon and of Cardinal Eugène Tisserand (thereby winning the French Academy Colas Prize in 2012). Fouilloux has edited the private diaries of the theologian Yves Congar(Cerf 2000) and of the Paris nunciature years of Giuseppe Roncalli, the future Pope John XXIII, and written a five-volume history of the Second Vatican Council. Fouilloux has also analysed the contribution of the Lyons Institut des Sources Chrétiennes to the editing of patristic texts.

== Selected publications ==
- La Collection "Sources chrétiennes". Editor les Pères de l'Eglise au XXè siècle, Paris, Cerf, 1993 (2nd edition 2011)
- Angelo Giuseppe Roncalli-Giovanni XXIII, Journal de France, I,1945-1948, Paris, Cerf, 2006; II,1949-1953, Paris, Cerf, 2008
