= Rodrigo García (author) =

Argentinian author

- Born: 1964 (age 61–62)
- Occupations: writer and author
- Known for: Golgota Picnic

Rodrigo García (born 1964) is an Argentinian author. His play Golgota Picnic was the subject of controversy in France and Poland.

== Europe Theatre Prize ==
In 2009, he was awarded the XI Europe Prize Theatrical Realities, in Wrocław. The prize organization stated that "García defines and exposes the myths of today in order to question their devastating effect on the middle levels of society, the stamping ground of capitalist alienation."
