= Golgota Picnic =

2011 play by Rodrigo García

- Written by: Rodrigo García
- Original language: Spanish

Premiere
- Date premiered: 2011
- Place premiered: Centro Dramático Nacional, Madrid

Golgota Picnic ("Golgotha Picnic") is a 2011 play by the Argentinian playwright Rodrigo García that attracted criticism from conservative Christian groups.

== Theme ==
García described the play as interweaving serious critique of consumer society, despair over the human race through a deconstruction of Jesus of Nazareth.

For Golgota Picnic, Rodrigo Garcia has collaborated for the first time with musician Marino Formenti, who performs in the show "The Seven Last Words of Our Saviour On the Cross" by Joseph Haydn on a piano, completely naked.

The play has been shown in a number of countries, including Spain.

== Controversies ==
The play attracted criticism from conservative Christian groups. Its performance in 2011 in the French city of Toulouse, and subsequently in Paris, led to protests by French Catholics. Archbishop of Toulouse, Robert Le Gall, said that the play "fouled the faith of many believers", and bishop Dominique Rey of Frejus-Toulon criticized Garcia's depiction of Christ as "madman, dog, pyromaniac, messiah of Aids, devil-whore, no better than a terrorist". The head of the Théâtre du Rond-Point received death threats before the play's opening. Despite the protests, Christian activists' request to have the play banned in France were futile. Protests against the play have in turn aroused criticism from groups defending free speech. In 2011 Christian protestors in France faced counter-demonstrations by free speech groups.

In 2014 protests Polish Catholics and nationalist activists protested against staging of this play in Poland. As in France, the play faced criticism from high-ranking members of the Catholic Church, such as archbishop Stanisław Gądecki. While the play was staged in theaters across Poland, theater goers faced hostile crowds attempting to bar them entry, singing religious ceremony, shouting criticism of the play, and on occasions, attempting to perform exorcisms. Several theaters have caved in and cancelled the play. The play was also withdrawn from the Malta Festival Poznań due to fears of riots. García described this as a religion-inspired censorship. Dissenting artists held informal readings of the play, and a number of prominent artists led by film director Agnieszka Holland petitioned Polish government to intervene and prevent religious radicals from violating the freedom of expression, describing the protester actions as "an assault against Polish and European democracy and a symptom of backwardness". Meanwhile, politicians from the conservative Law and Justice party said that the play violates Polish blasphemy laws (Article 196 of the Polish Criminal Code which states that the "anyone who offends the religious feelings of other people [can be] subject to a fine, restriction of liberty or imprisonment for up to two years"), and filed a motion with prosecutions for investigation. Polish culture minister Małgorzata Omilanowska supported the artists by saying "Freedom of artistic expression is the basis of democracy and the constitution." A major newspaper, Gazeta Wyborcza, published the script on 28 June. Magazine Polityka described the play as "the most famous in the 250-year history of Polish theater".
