= Galia Ackerman =

French-Russian translator (born 1948)

- Галя Аккерман
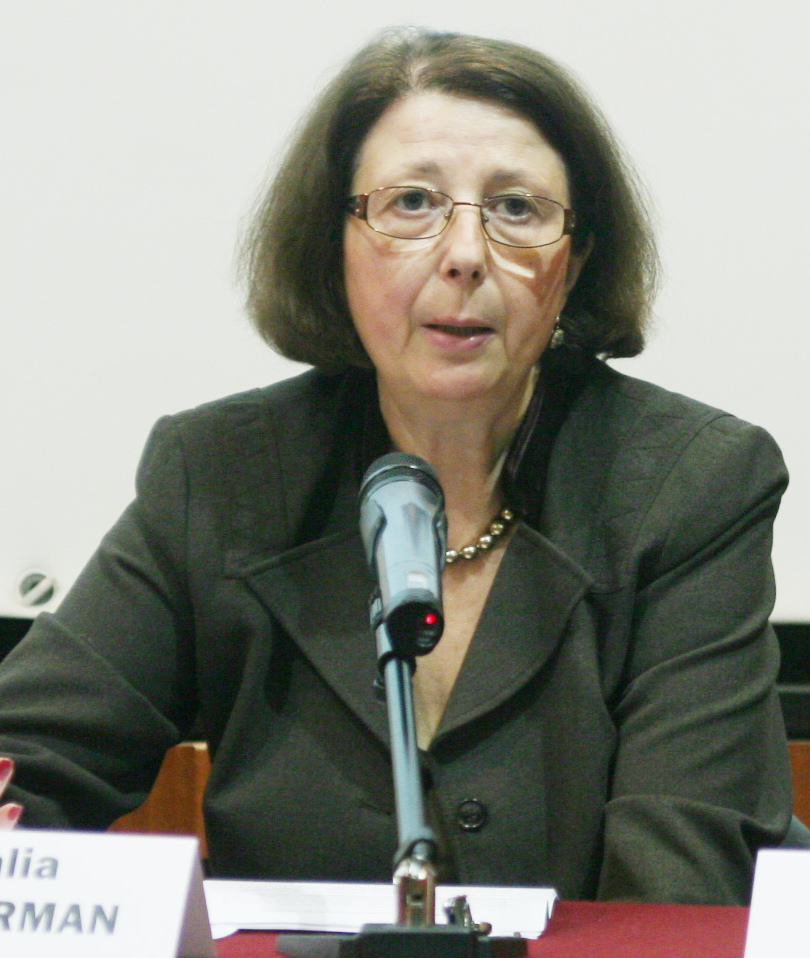
- Born: 1948 (age 77–78)
- Education: University of Paris 1 Pantheon-Sorbonne
- Writing career
- Occupations: Writer; translator; researcher
- Language: French, Russian
- Genres: documentary, essay, research, Russian documentary translation
- Notable works: (In French) Traverser Tchernobyl; Le régiment immortel; la guerre sacrée de Poutine

Galina Ackerman or usually Galia Ackerman (Russian: Галя Аккерман) (born 1948) is a French-Russian writer, historian, journalist, translator, researcher at the University of Caen, specializing on Ukraine and Post-Soviet states. She was also a translator for slain Russian journalist Anna Politkovskaya.

== Biography ==
Galia Ackerman was born in 1948 into a Russian Jewish family. She holds a doctorate in history from the University of Paris 1 Pantheon-Sorbonne and is an associate researcher at the University of Caen.

=== Crossing Chernobyl ===
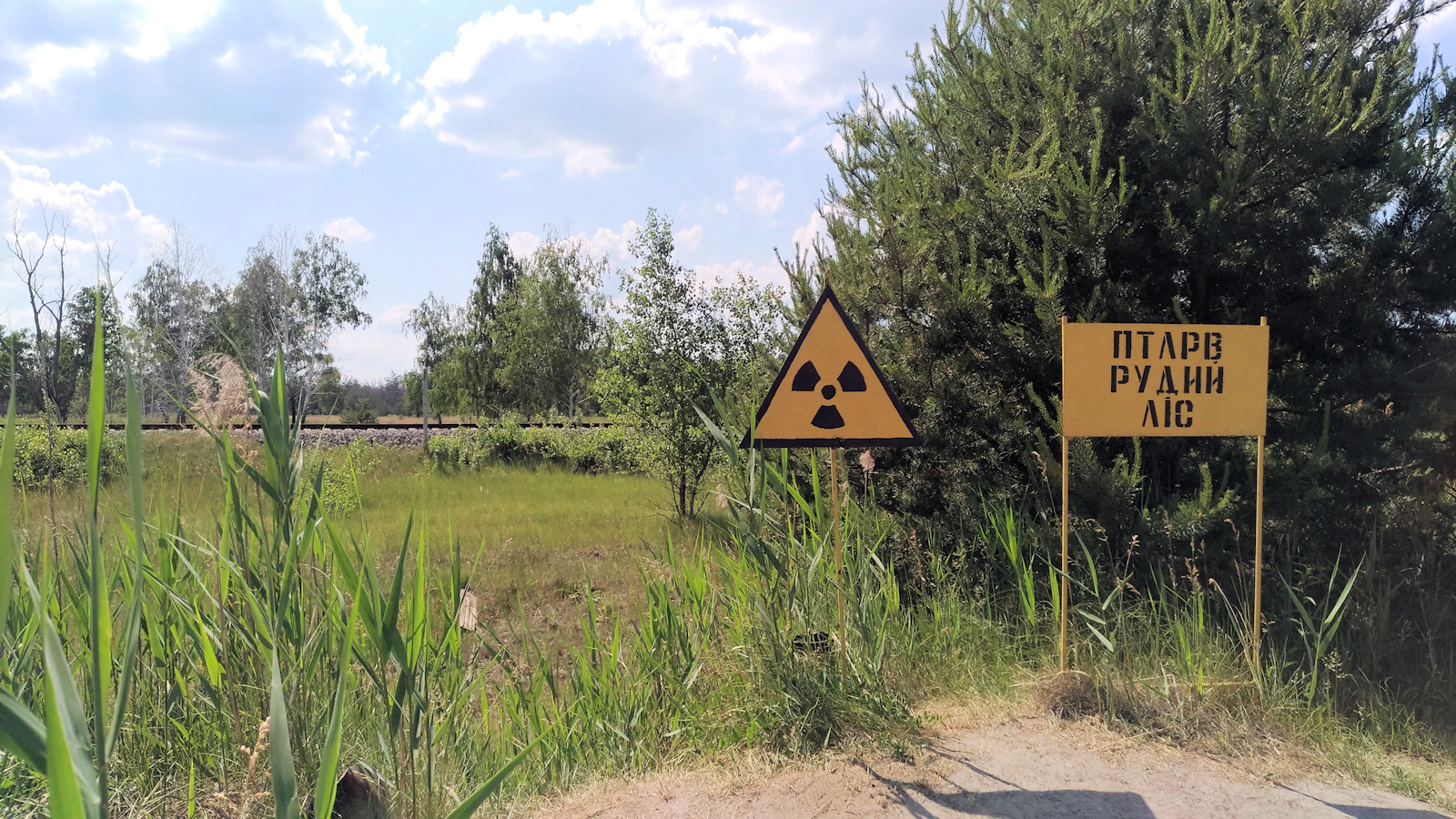
Zone

In 1998, Galia Ackerman translated into French the 'Chernobyl Prayer' by Svetlana Alexievich, a documentary about the Chernobyl disaster. While working on the translation, she traveled in the poisoned territories called 'Zone' (short for Chernobyl Exclusion Zone), in Belarus, and interviewed local well-known personalities about the nuclear catastrophe.

When she published her gathered stories about 'Zone', the Center of Modern Art of Barcelona asked her in 2003 prepare an exhibition about 'Zone'. To prepare the materials for the Center of Modern Art, Galia Ackerman traveled from 2003 to 2006 in Ukraine. She co-worked with a museum about the catastrophe in Kyiv, met with local people, and gathered various artefacts like special clothes of recovery workers, various Geiger counters. As result, she talked with many local people, gathered much information, and wrote her first documentary in 2006 about 'Zone', but, as she said, it was just a pure history of the catastrophe.

Since then, Galia Ackerman used to travel in Ukraine, visited 'Zone', met local people and became a friend with Ukrainian poet Lina Kostenko, who also often visited Chernobyl Exclusion Zone. So she decided to write a new story entitled 'Crossing Chernobyl' to tell her 20-year-long experience about Chernobyl, thoughts, mental pictures of Chernobyl. The book was published in France.

== Selected bibliography ==
=== Books ===
- French: Traverser Tchernobyl; Premier Parallèle, 2016 (Crossing Chernobyl; Premier Parallèle, 2016)
- French: Le régiment immortel; la guerre sacrée de Poutine; Premier Parallèle, 2019 (The Immortal Regiment; The Sacred War of Putin; Premier Parallèle, 2019)
