= Alain Escada =

Belgian far-right activist

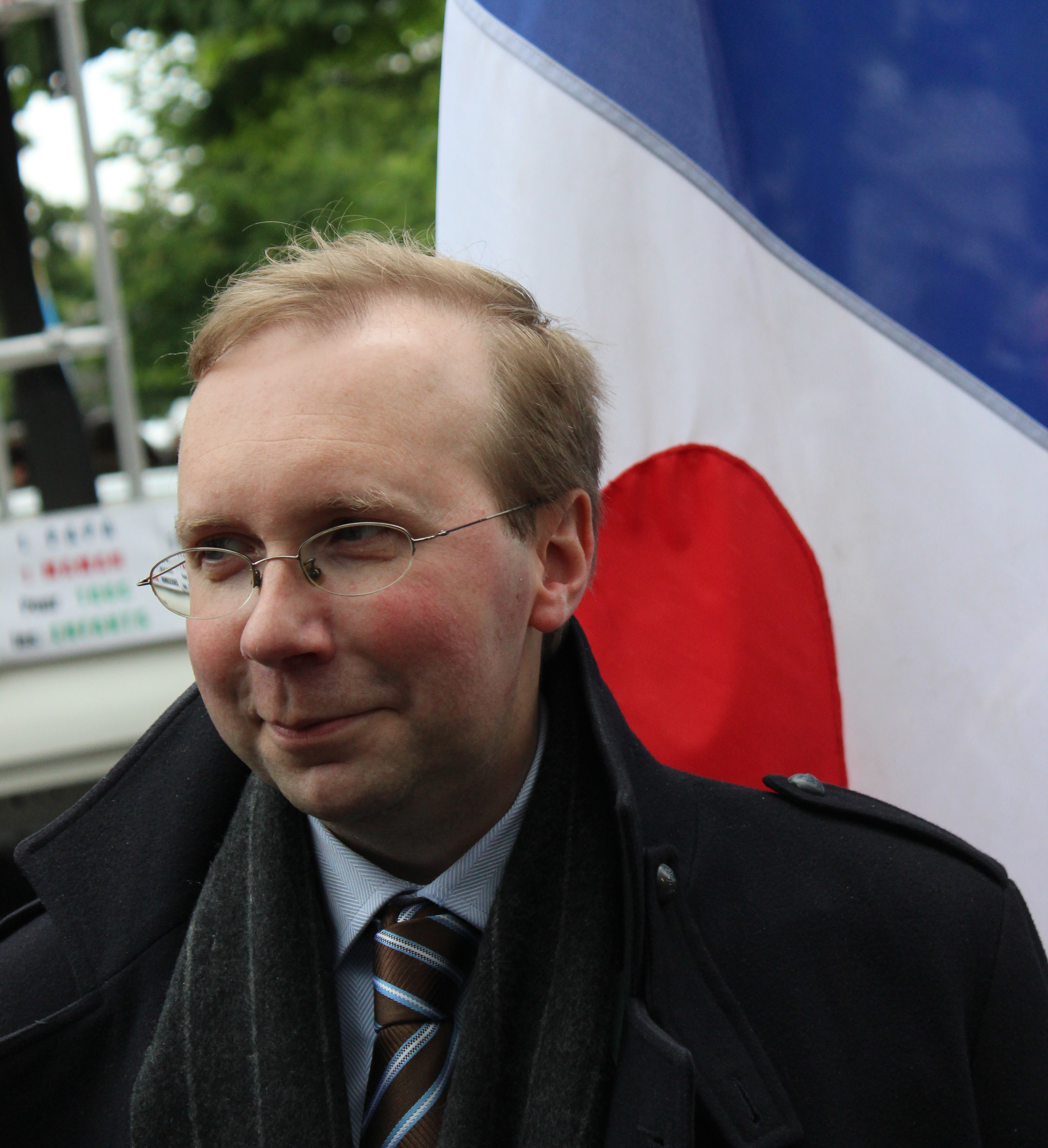
Escada in May 2013

Alain Escada, born 16 May 1970 in Brussels, is a Belgian activist. Since 2012, he has been the chairman of Civitas, a French Traditionalist Catholic organization. Under his leadership, in 2012–13, Civitas opposed same-sex marriage in France, with Escada calling it a "Pandora's box" for polygamy and incest.

In June 2016, Civitas changed its status from a cultural organisation to a French political party and in 2017 Escada announced that Civitas will run in the next French parliamentary elections.

Escada is the President of the Coalition pour la Vie et la Famille, whose status as a European party brings 500.000 euros a year of European funds.
