= Frigide Barjot =

French humorist and political activist (born 1962)

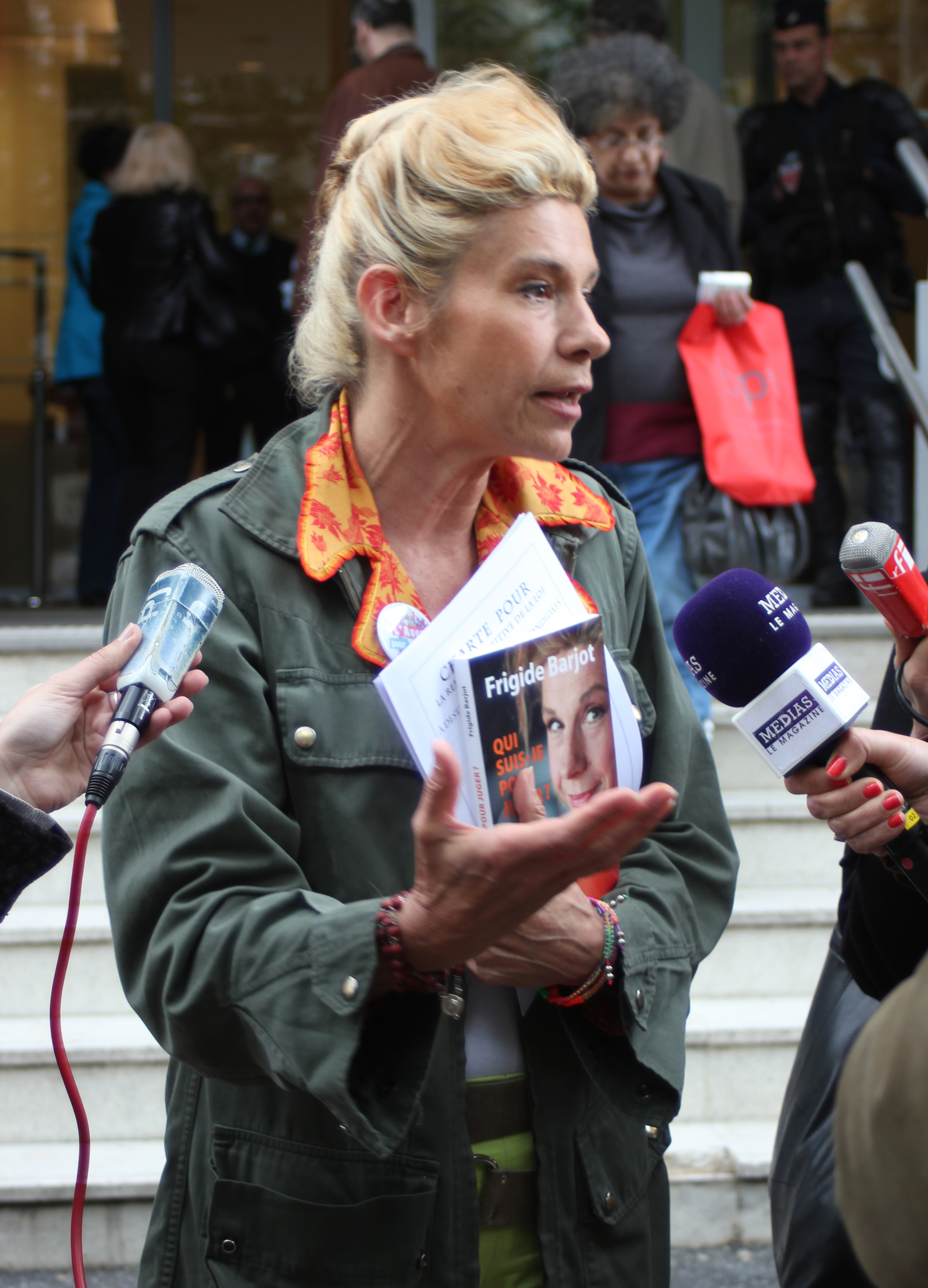
- Frigide Barjot in 2014
- Born: Virginie Merle; 25 September 1962 (age 64); Boulogne-Billancourt, France
- Education: Jean Moulin University Lyon 3 Sciences Po
- Occupation: Activist
- Known for: Opposition to same-sex marriage in France

Virginie Tellenne (née Merle; born September 25, 1962) better known by her alias Frigide Barjot, is a French humorist, columnist and political activist. A former socialite of the Parisian nightlife, who organized events defending the Catholic faith in the 2000s, Barjot rose to prominence in the early 2010s in France as a vocal campaigner against same-sex marriage and LGBT adoption.

== Biography ==
Born into a family from Lyon, Virginie Merle studied the law at Jean Moulin University Lyon 3 and Sciences Po before joining the public relations office of the French Gaullist political party Rally for the Republic (RPR). As a young woman, Barjot was a figure of the Parisian nightlife, and would regularly attend gay clubs; she has described herself as a "fag hag" (fille à pédés in French).

In the 1980s, Barjot met Bruno Tellenne, also known as Basile de Koch, a speechwriter and the founder of comedy group Jalons; the group styled itself as a "cultural intervention group", which specialized in parody and subvertising campaigns. She later became herself a member of Jalons, adopting the alias "Frigide Barjot", (Note: The pseudonym, a pun on French sex symbol Brigitte Bardot, is made from frigide which is French for "frigid", and barjot which is slang meaning "crazy".) and gradually became a prominent member within the group. In the 1990s, Barjot was a regular guest on some French talk shows such as On a tout essayé.

In 2004, Barjot claimed to have had a mystical experience during a trip to Lourdes which reportedly renewed her Roman Catholic faith. She became gradually more vocal about her religion, presenting herself as "Jesus's press attaché" and organizing events defending Christianity, especially then-Pope Benedict XVI.

In 2012, as the French government announced their proposal to make same-sex marriage legal in France, Barjot was one of activists who organized demonstrations in Paris to oppose the project. She became a spokeswoman for La Manif pour Tous, an umbrella organization campaigning against same-sex marriage and LGBT adoption.

== Personal life ==
In 1994, Barjot married humorist Basile de Koch (born Bruno Tellenne), founder of comedy group Jalons of which Barjot was a member. As of 2013, they have two children.

== Filmography ==
- Trois zéros (2002) – as Brigitte
- People (2004) – as a jet setter
- Turf (2013) – as a guest

== Bibliography ==
- J'élève mon mari, Éditions Jean-Claude Lattès, 2001, ISBN 2-7096-2234-3
- J'éduque mes parents (co-authored with Basile de Koch), Éditions Jean-Claude Lattès, 2004
- Manuel de survie de la femme moderne
- Le manifeste foutiste : traité de sagesse à l'usage des petits et des glands (co-authored with Basile de Koch), Éditions Jean-Claude Lattès, 2000 ISBN 2-709-62125-8
- Confessions d'une catho branchée, Éditions Plon, 2011 ISBN 978-2-259-21307-3
- Touche pas à mon sexe, contre le « mariage » gay, Éditions Mordicus, 2013, ISBN 978-2-918-41459-9

== See also ==
- LGBT rights in France
