= Les Invalides =

Building complex in Paris, France

Hôtel des Invalides
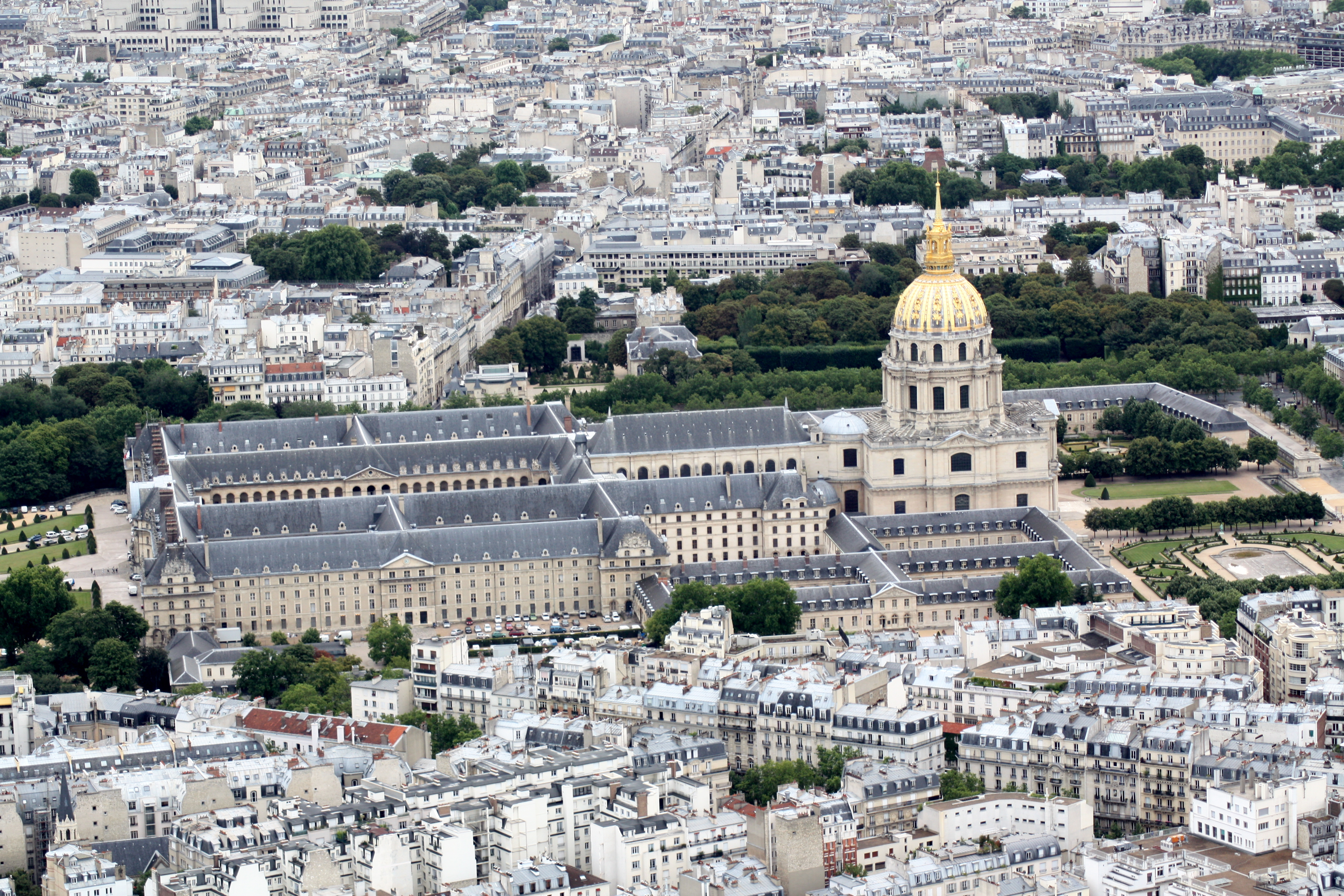
- View of Les Invalides from the Eiffel Tower
- Alternative names: Les Invalides, Musée de l'Armée

General information
- Type: Museum, church, hospital, retirement home, mausoleum
- Architectural style: Baroque
- Location: Paris, France
- Coordinates: 48°51′18″N 2°18′45″E
- Construction started: 1671
- Completed: 1706
- Inaugurated: 1678

Design and construction
- Architects: Libéral Bruant; Jules Hardouin-Mansart

The Hôtel des Invalides (French: [otɛl dez‿ɛ̃valid]; French for 'House of Invalids'), commonly called Les Invalides ([lez‿ɛ̃valid]; lit. 'the Invalids'), is a complex of buildings in the 7th arrondissement of Paris, France, containing museums and monuments, all relating to the military history of France, as well as a hospital and an old soldiers' retirement home, the building's original purpose. The buildings house the Musée de l'Armée (the museum of the Army of France), the Musée des Plans-Reliefs, and the Musée d'Histoire Contemporaine. The complex also includes the Cathedral of Saint-Louis-des-Invalides, the national cathedral of the French military. It is adjacent to the Royal Chapel known as the Dôme des Invalides, the tallest church building in Paris at a height of 107 metres (351 ft). The latter has been converted into a shrine to some of France's leading military figures, most notably the tomb of Napoleon.

== History ==
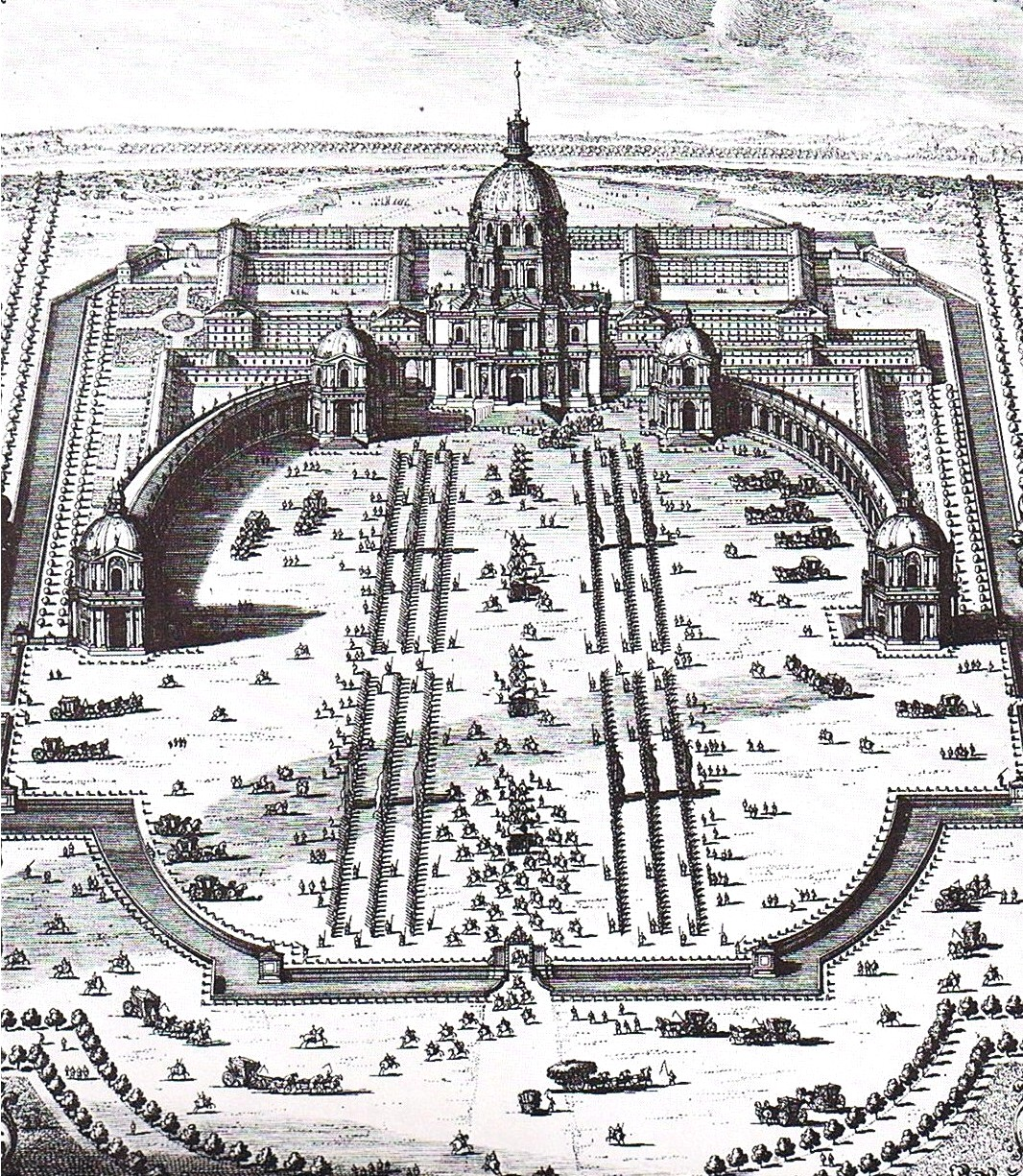
Mansard's original plan for Les Invalides (about 1700)

Louis XIV initiated the project by an order dated 24 November 1670 to create a home and hospital for aged and disabled (invalide) soldiers, the veterans of his many military campaigns. The initial architect of Les Invalides was Libéral Bruant. The selected site was in the then suburban plain of Grenelle (plaine de Grenelle). By the time the enlarged project was completed in 1676, the façade fronting the Seine measured 196 metres (643 ft) in width, and the complex had fifteen courtyards, the largest being the cour d'honneur designed for military parades. The church-and-chapel complex of the Invalides was designed by Jules Hardouin-Mansart in 1676, taking inspiration from his great-uncle François Mansart's design for a Chapelle des Bourbons to be built behind the chancel of the Basilica of Saint-Denis, the French monarch's necropolis since ancient times. Several projects were submitted in the mid-1660s by both Mansart and Gian Lorenzo Bernini, who was residing in Paris at the time. Mansart's second project is very close to Hardouin-Mansart's concept of the Royal Chapel or Dome Church at Les Invalides, both in terms of its architecture and of its relationship with the adjacent church. Architectural historian Allan Braham has hypothesized that the domed chapel was initially intended to be a new burial place for the Bourbon Dynasty, but that project was not implemented. Instead, the massive building was designated as the private chapel of the monarch, which was attached to the Cathedral attended by the veterans. The Dôme des Invalides remains as one of the prime exemplars of French Baroque architecture, at 107 metres (351 ft) high, and also as an iconic symbol of France's absolute monarchy.

The interior of the dome was painted by Le Brun's disciple Charles de La Fosse with a Baroque illusionistic ceiling painting. The painting was completed in 1705.

Meanwhile, Hardouin-Mansart assisted the aged Bruant with the Cathedral of Saint-Louis-des-Invalides, Paris, which was finished to Bruant's design after the latter died in 1697. Daily attendance of the veterans in the church services was required. Shortly after the veterans' chapel was started, Louis XIV commissioned Mansart to construct a separate private royal chapel, now named its most striking feature. The Dome chapel was finished in 1706.

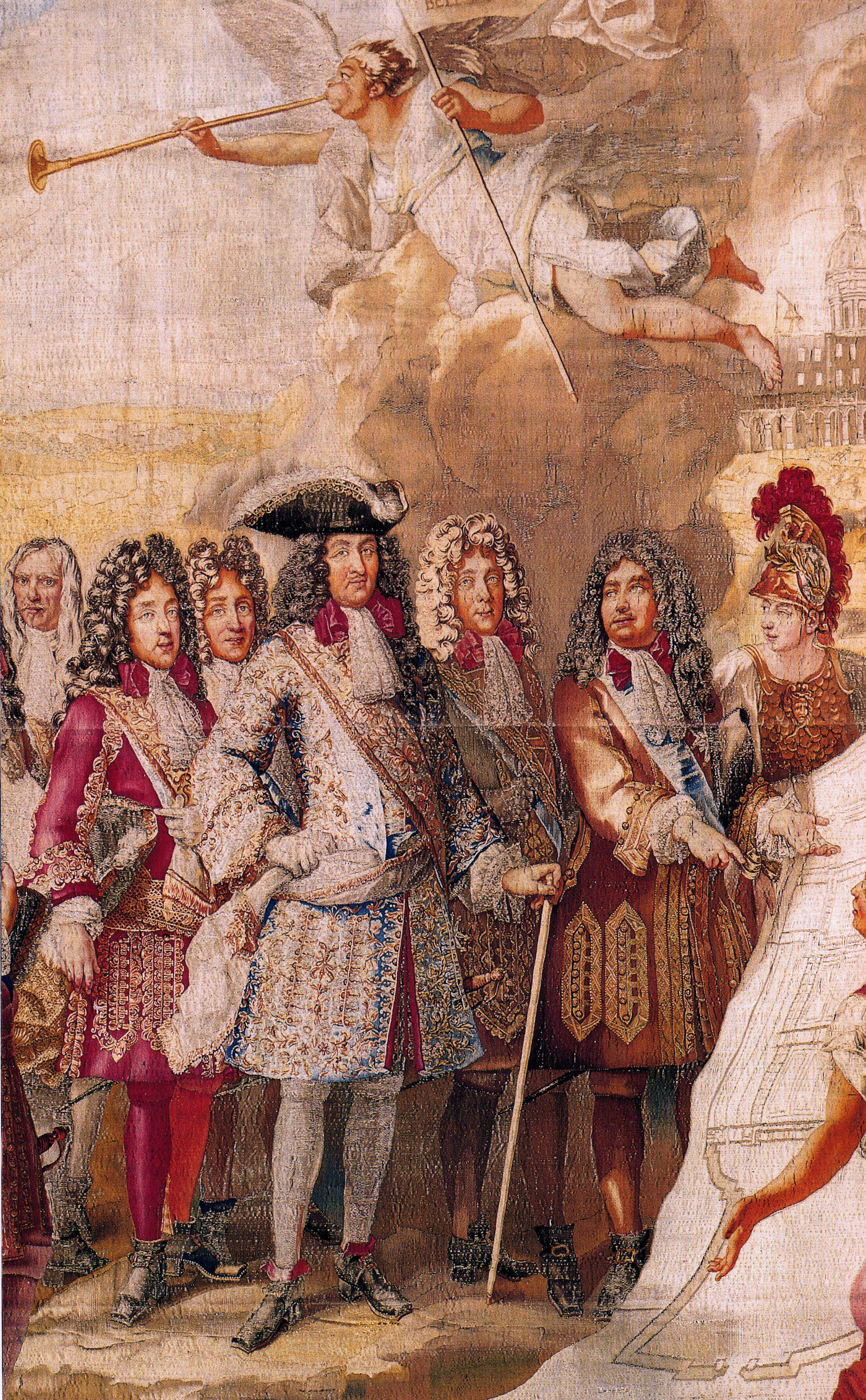
Louis XIV views the plans of Les Invalides

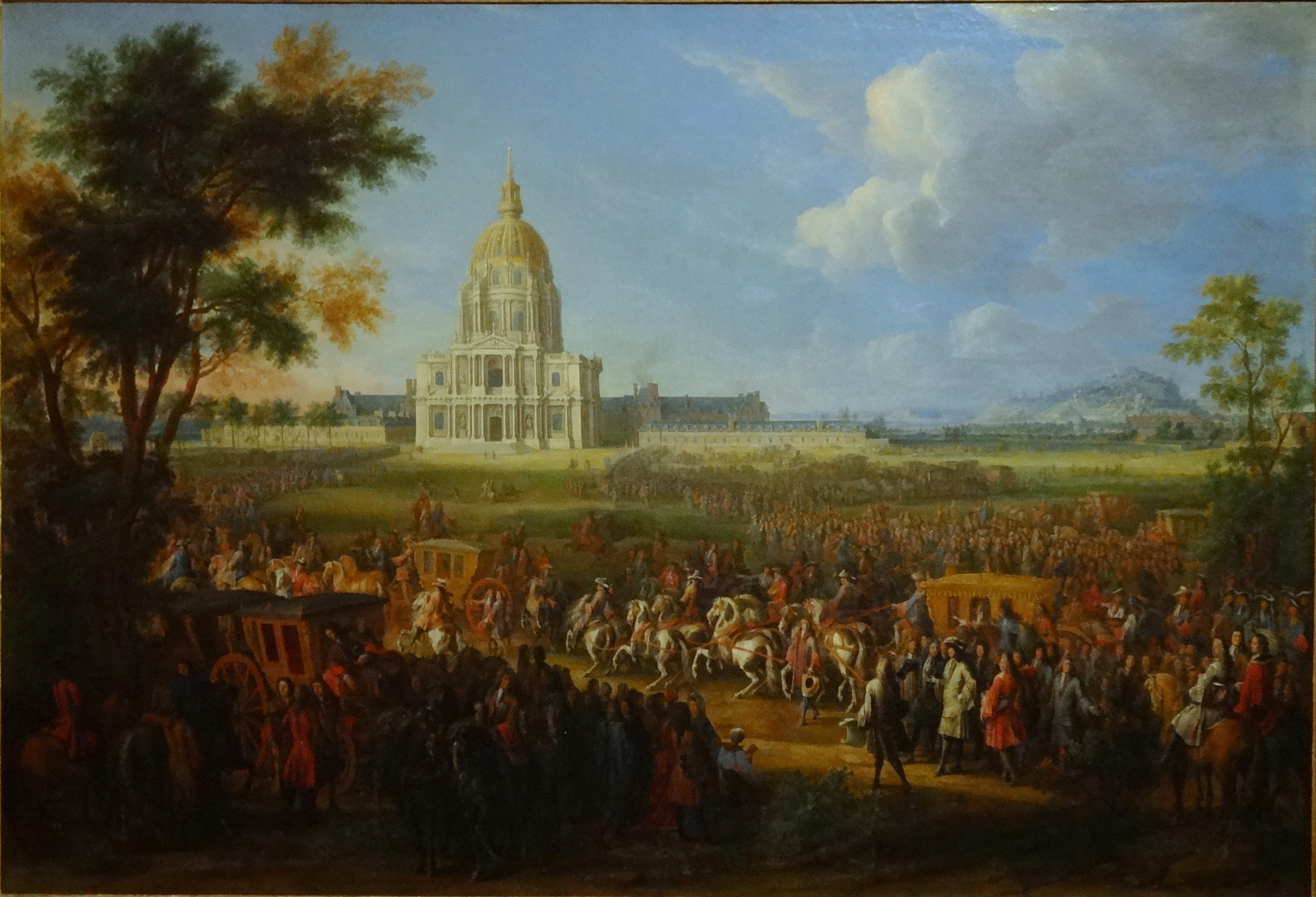
Visit of Louis XIV to Les Invalides (about 1706). Painting by Pierre-Denis Martin

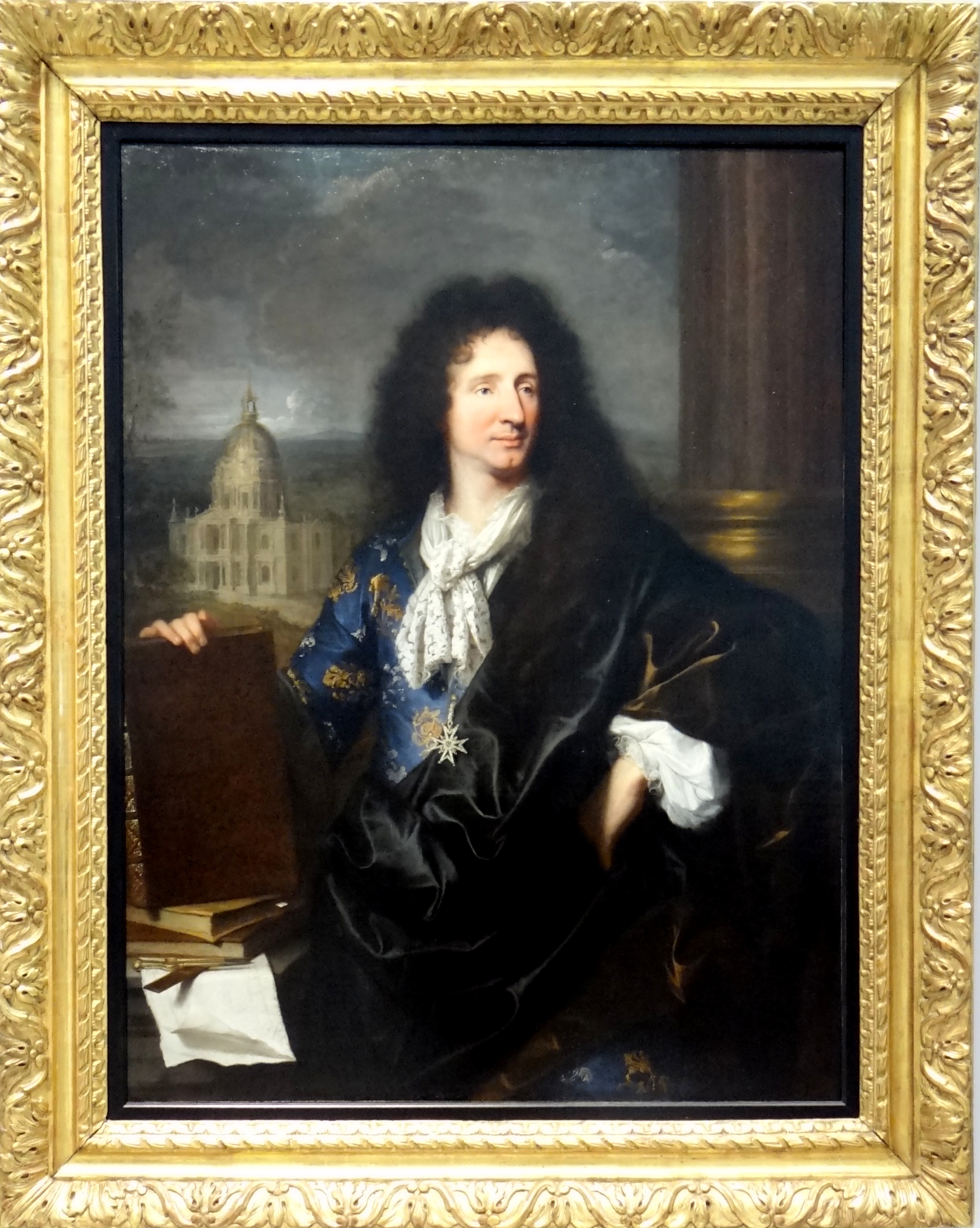
Portrait of Hardouin-Mansart by Hyacinthe Rigaud showing the Dome, Louvre

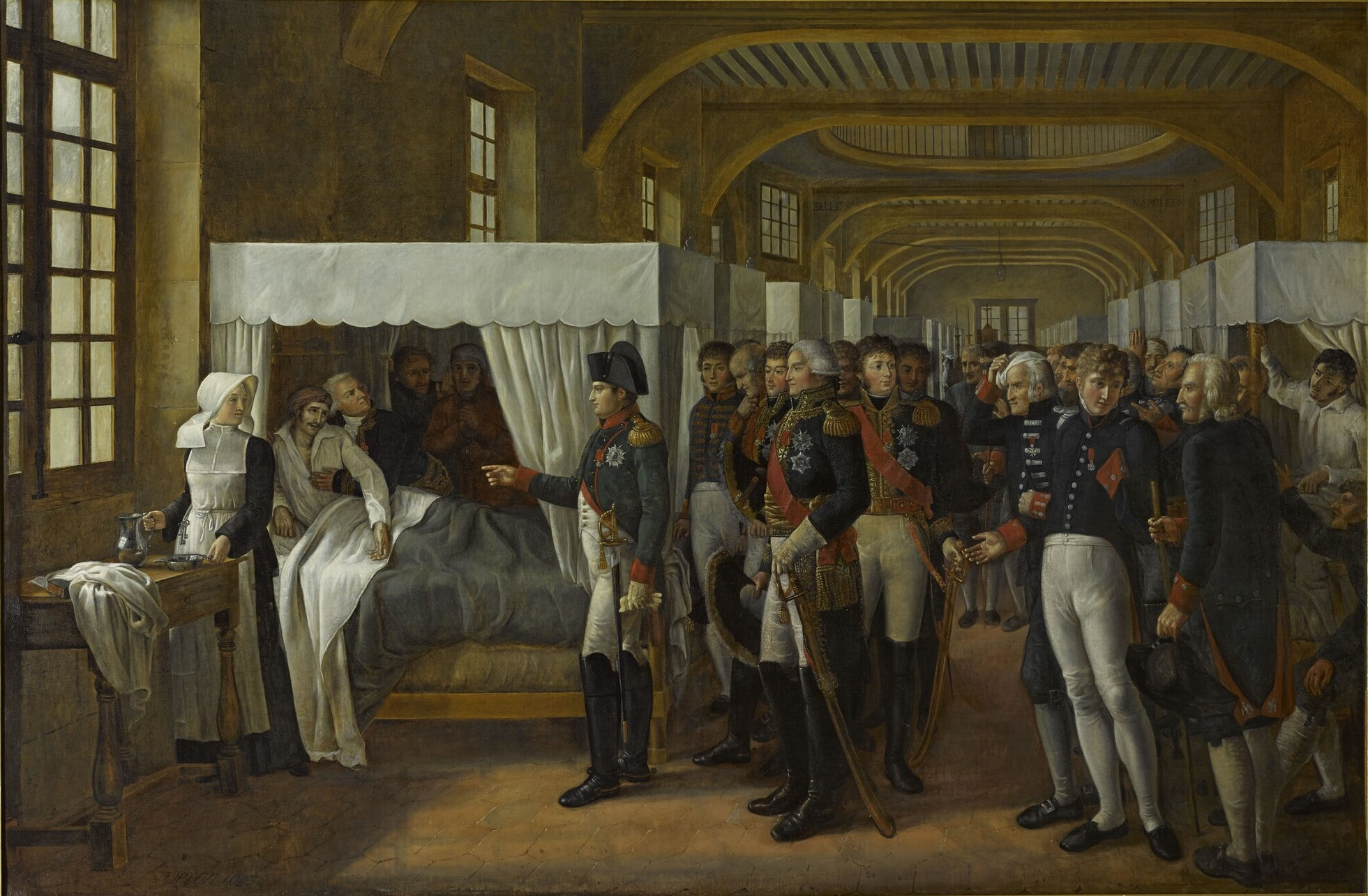
Napoleon I visiting the infirmary of Les Invalides

Because of its location and significance, the Invalides served as the scene for several key events in French history. On 14 July 1789, it was stormed by Parisian rioters who seized the cannons and muskets stored in its cellars to use against the Bastille later the same day. Napoleon was entombed under the Dome of the Invalides with a grand ceremony in 1840. The separation between the two churches was reinforced in the 19th century with the erection of Napoleon's tomb, the creation of the two separate altars, and the construction of a glass wall between the two chapels.

The building retained its primary function as a retirement home and hospital for military veterans (invalides) until the early twentieth century. In 1872, the musée d'artillerie (Artillery Museum) was located within the building to be joined by the musée historique des armées (Historical Museum of the Armies) in 1896. The two institutions were merged to form the present musée de l'armée in 1905. At the same time, the veterans in residence were dispersed to smaller centres outside Paris. The reason was that adopting a mainly conscript army after 1872 meant a substantial reduction in the number of veterans having the twenty or more years of military service formerly required to enter the Hôpital des Invalides. The building accordingly became too large for its original purpose. The modern complex does, however, still include the facilities detailed below for about a hundred elderly or incapacitated former soldiers.

When the Army Museum at Les Invalides was founded in 1905, the veterans' chapel was placed under its administrative control. It is now the cathedral of the Diocese of the French Armed Forces, officially known as Cathédrale Saint-Louis-des-Invalides.

=== 2024 Olympic and Paralympic venue ===
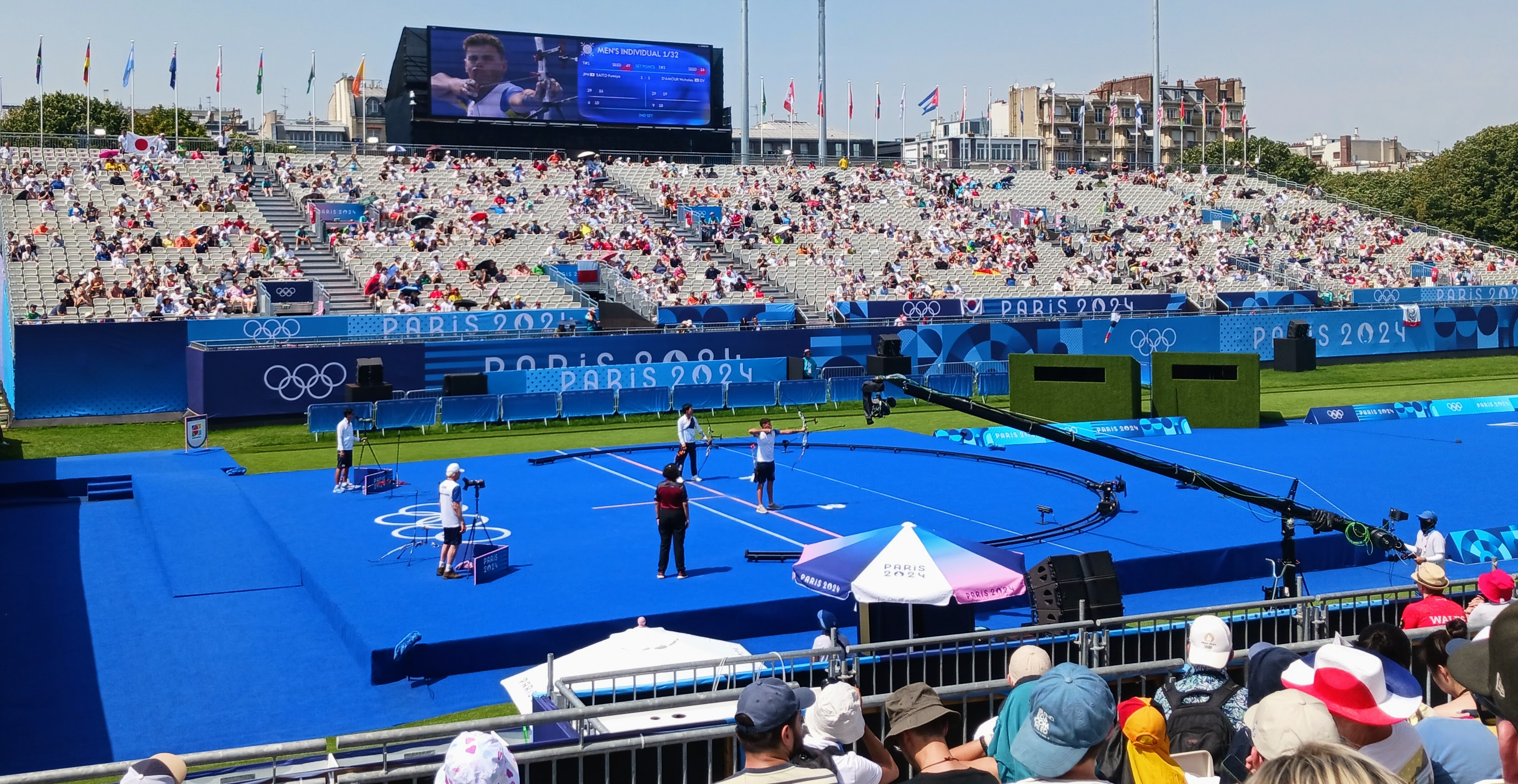
Men's Individual Archery at the Les Invalides venue.

The Esplanade des Invalides, the expansive green space in front of the historic Hôtel des Invalides, was a venue for several sports during the Paris 2024 Summer Olympics and 2024 Summer Paralympics. It hosted archery, para-archery, road cycling, and marathon events, with the Invalides buildings providing a backdrop.

== Architecture ==
=== North Front and entrance ===
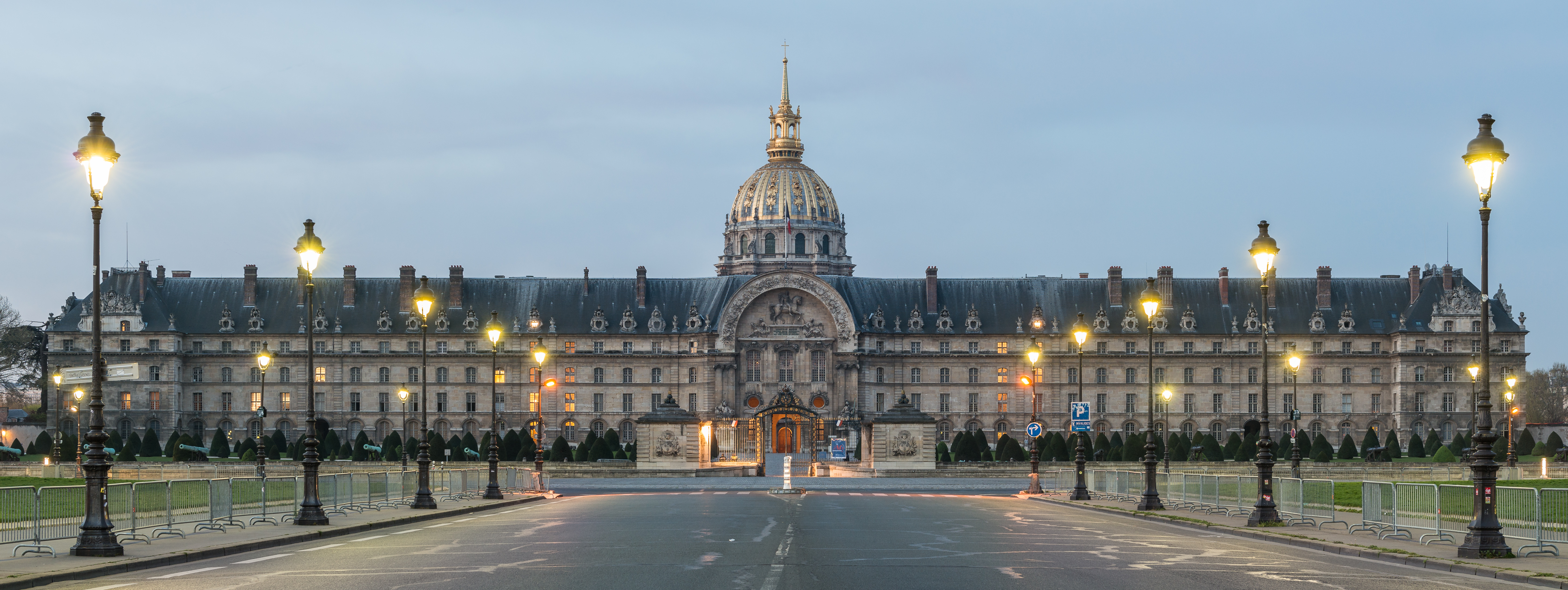
The north front of the Invalides: Hardouin-Mansart's Dome, behind it, stands above Bruant's pedimented central block

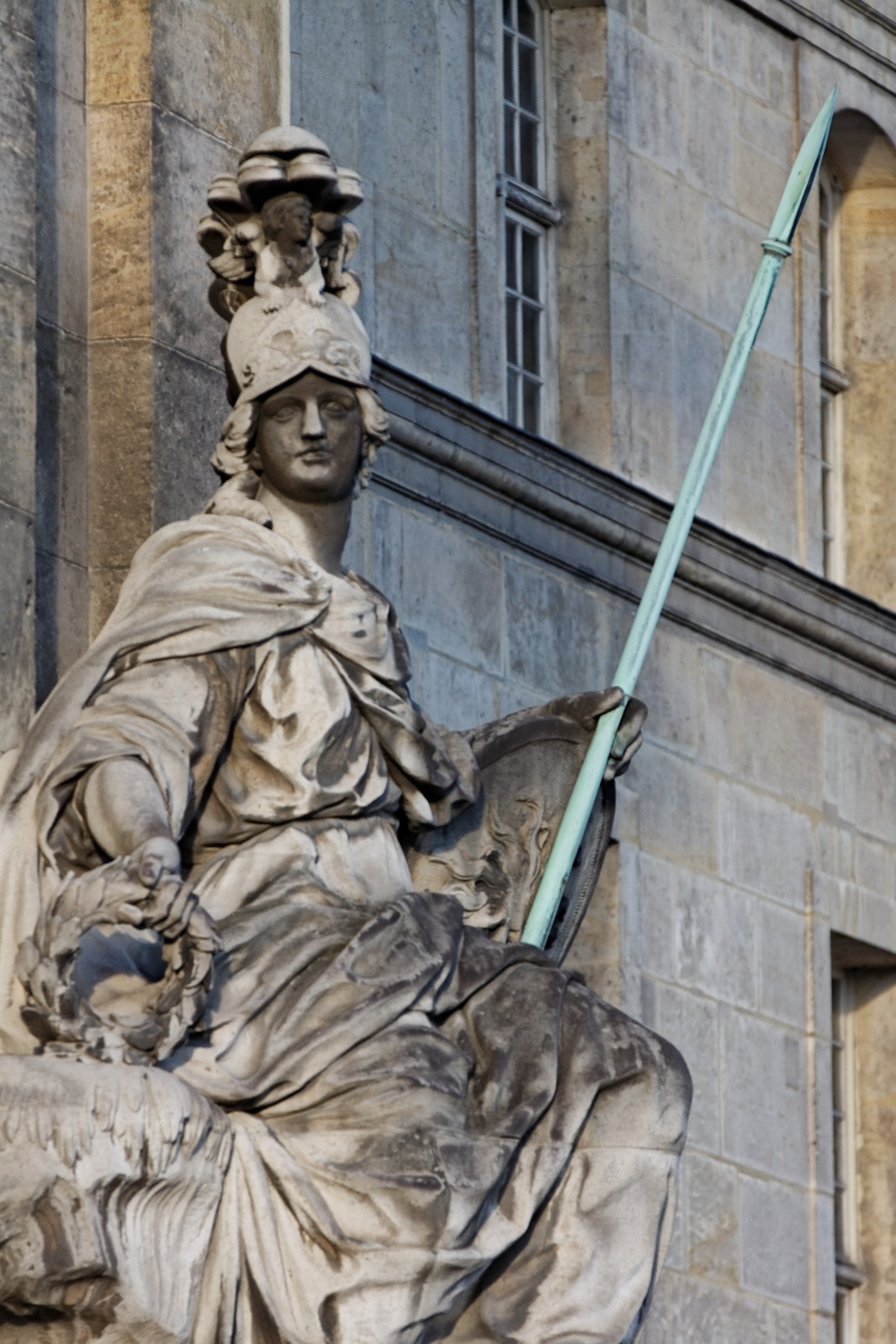
The portal is guarded by a statue of the Goddess Minerva

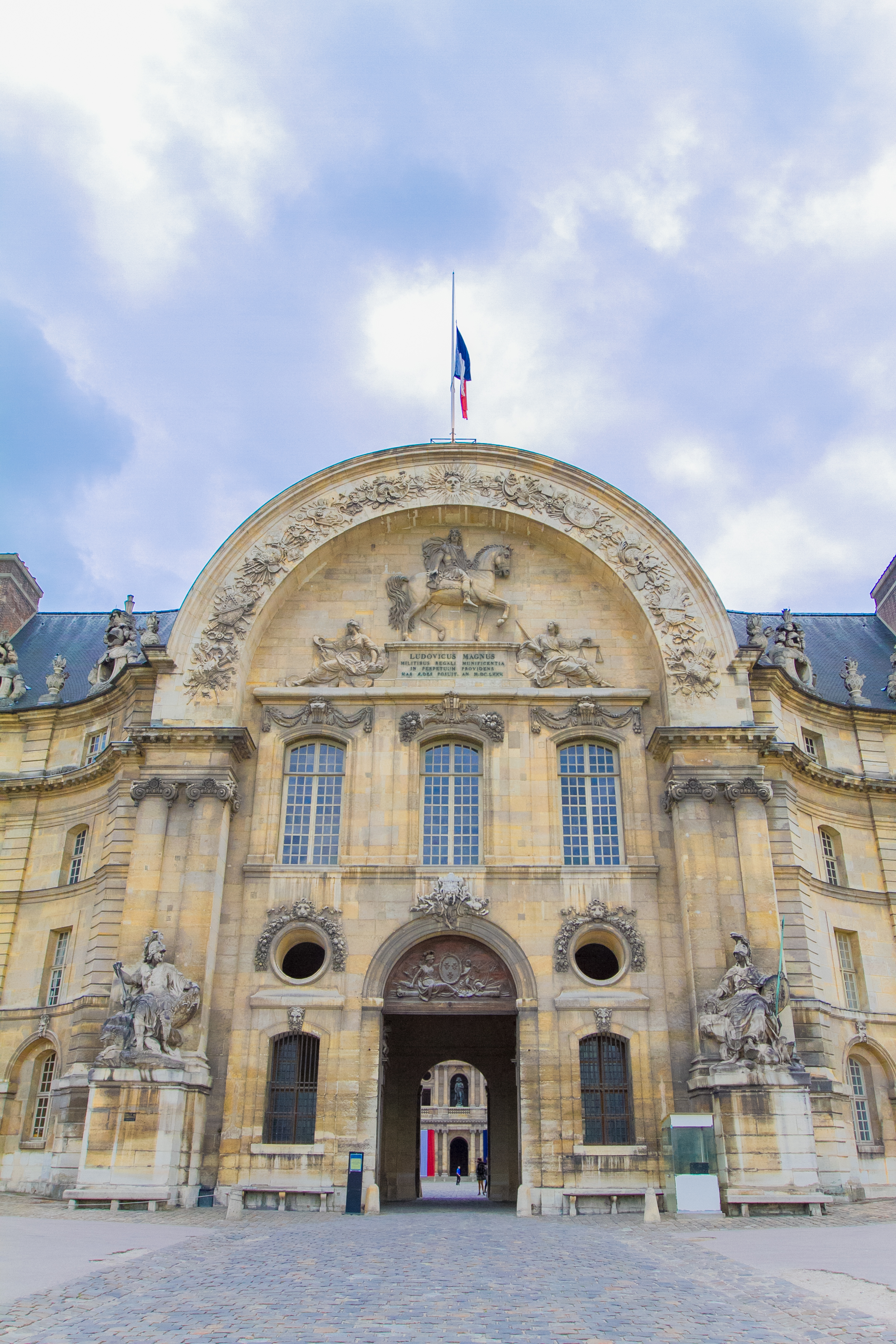
The north portal, depicting Louis XIV on horseback

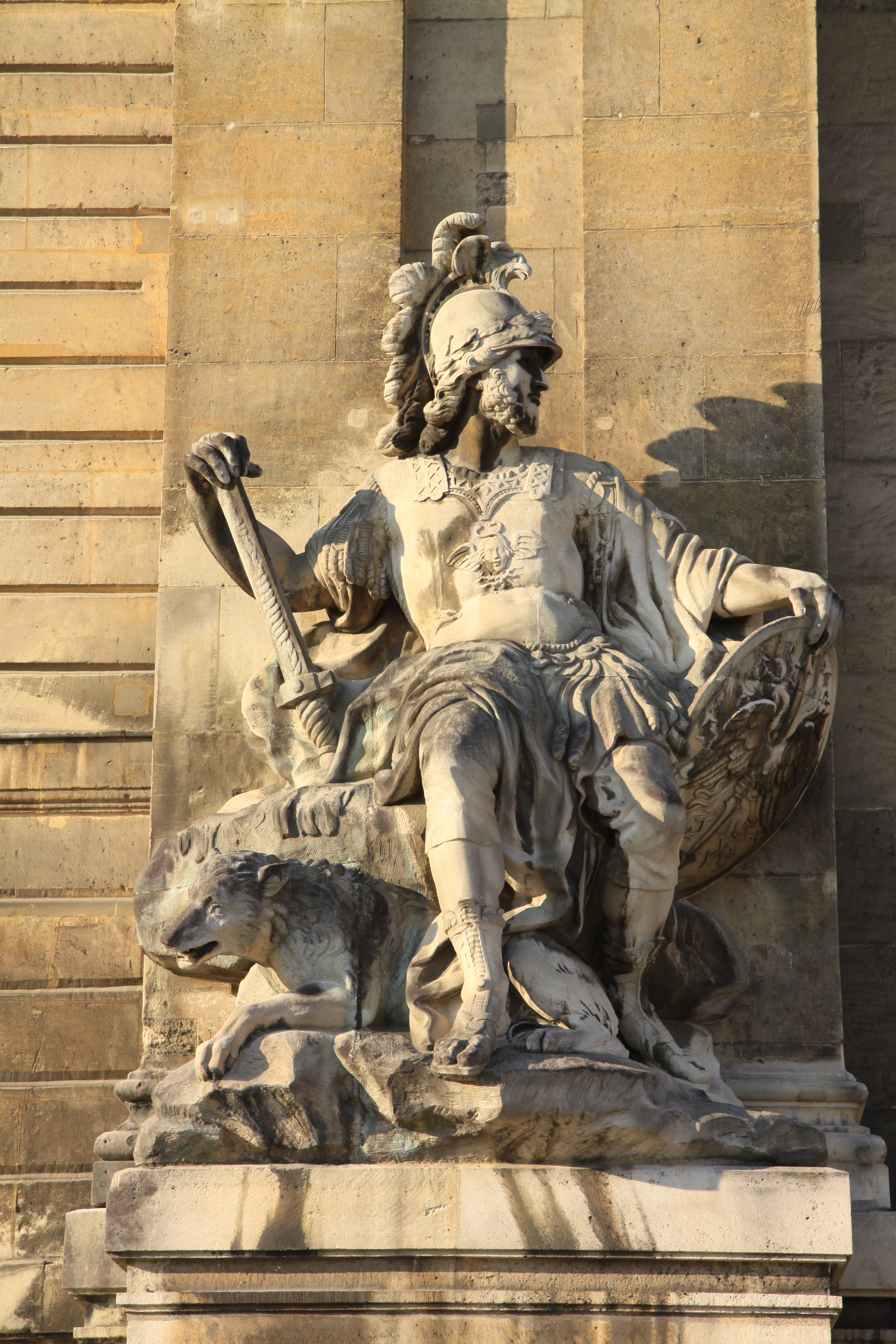
Statue of Mars, the Roman god of war, by the north portal

Hardouin-Mansart's Dome chapel is large enough to dominate the long façade yet harmonizes with Bruant's door under an arched pediment on the north front of Les Invalides. To the north, the courtyard (cour d'honneur) is extended by a wide public esplanade (Esplanade des Invalides) where the embassies of Austria and Finland are neighbors of the French Ministry of Foreign Affairs, all forming one of the grand open spaces in the heart of Paris. At its far end, the Pont Alexandre III links this grand urbanistic axis with the Petit Palais and the Grand Palais. The Pont des Invalides is next, downstream the Seine river.

=== The Dome des Invalides ===
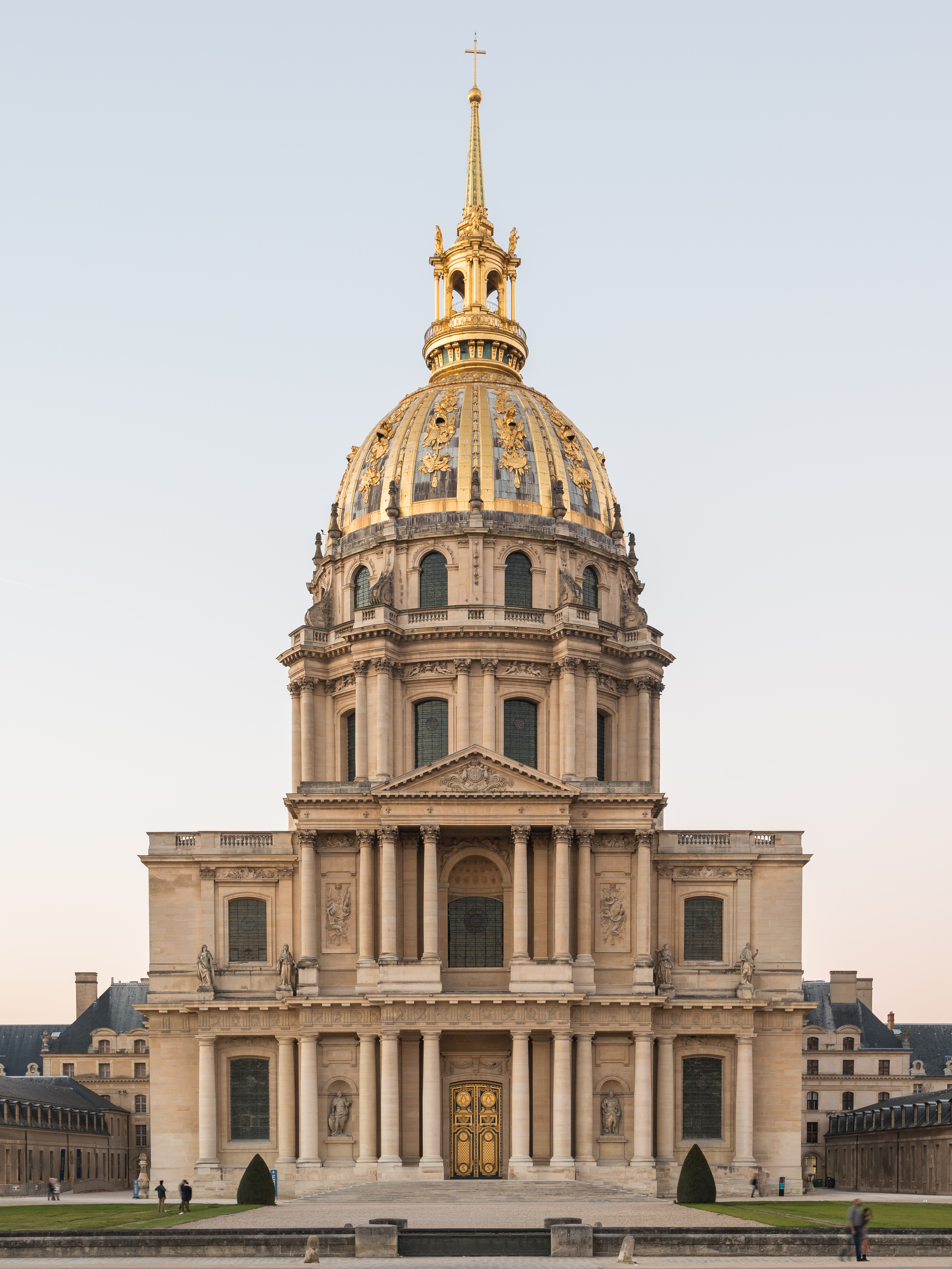
The Dôme des Invalides, 107 metres (351 ft) tall

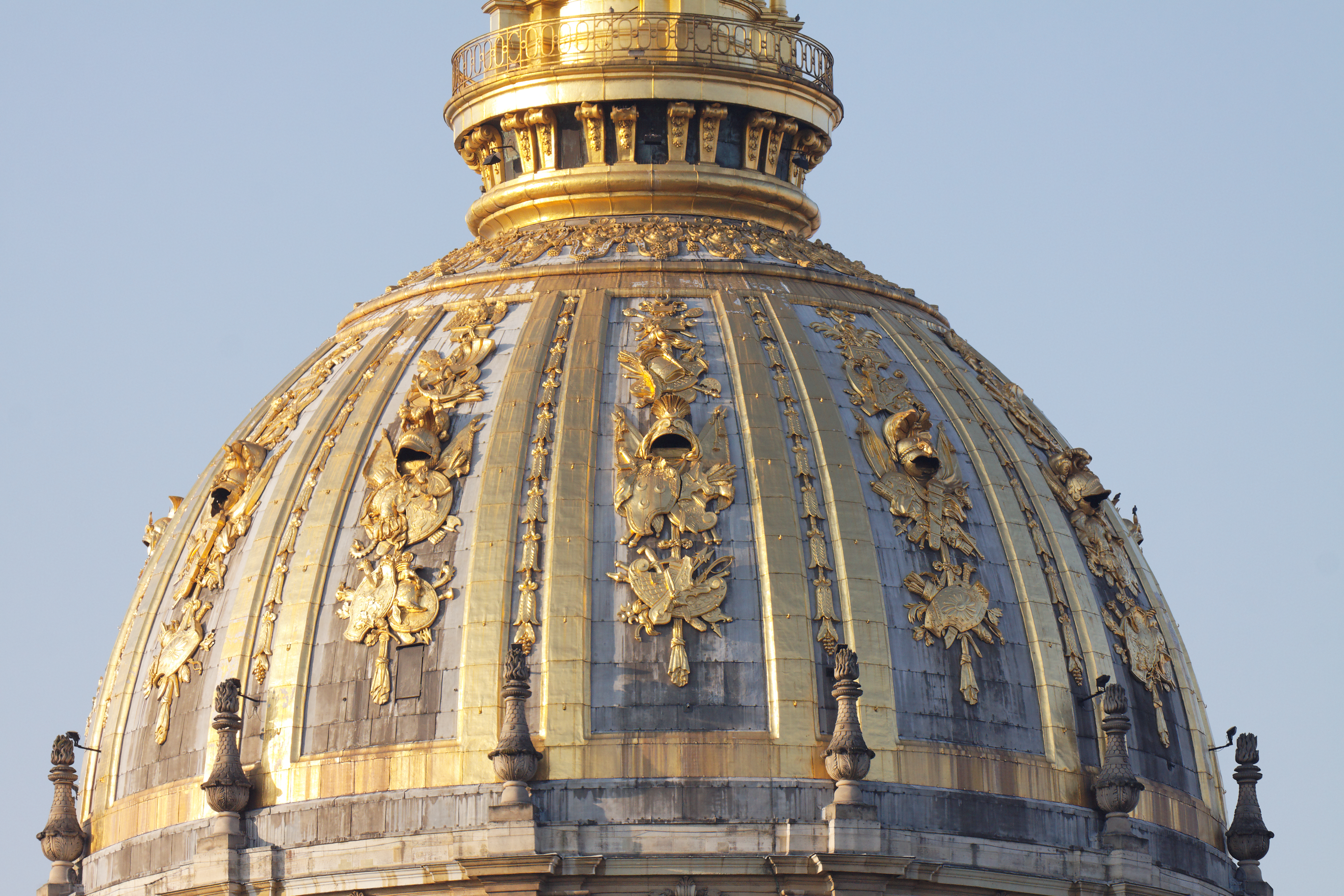
Detail of the dome, decorated with 12.65 kilograms (27.9 lb) of gold leaf

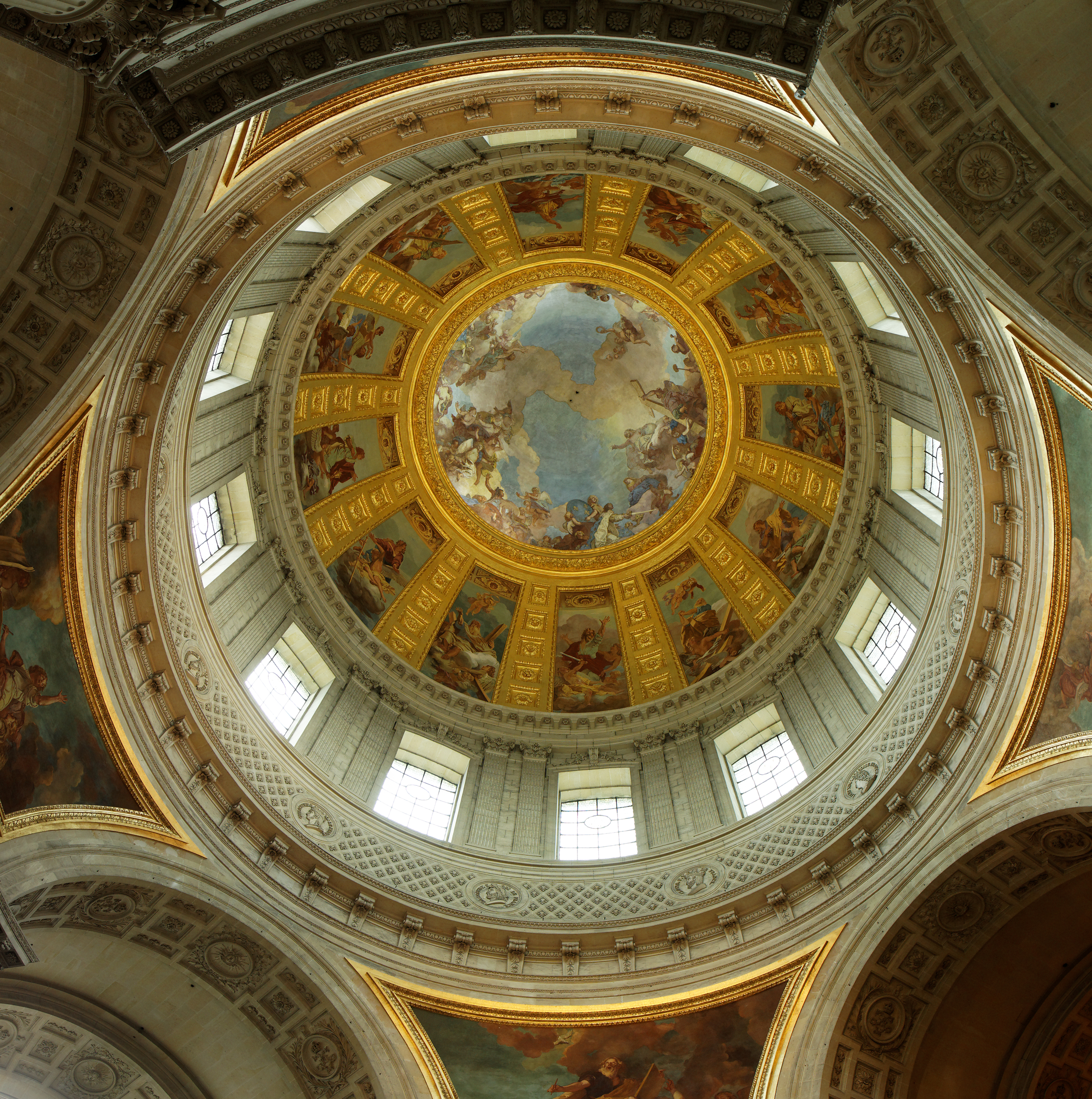
Interior of the Dome
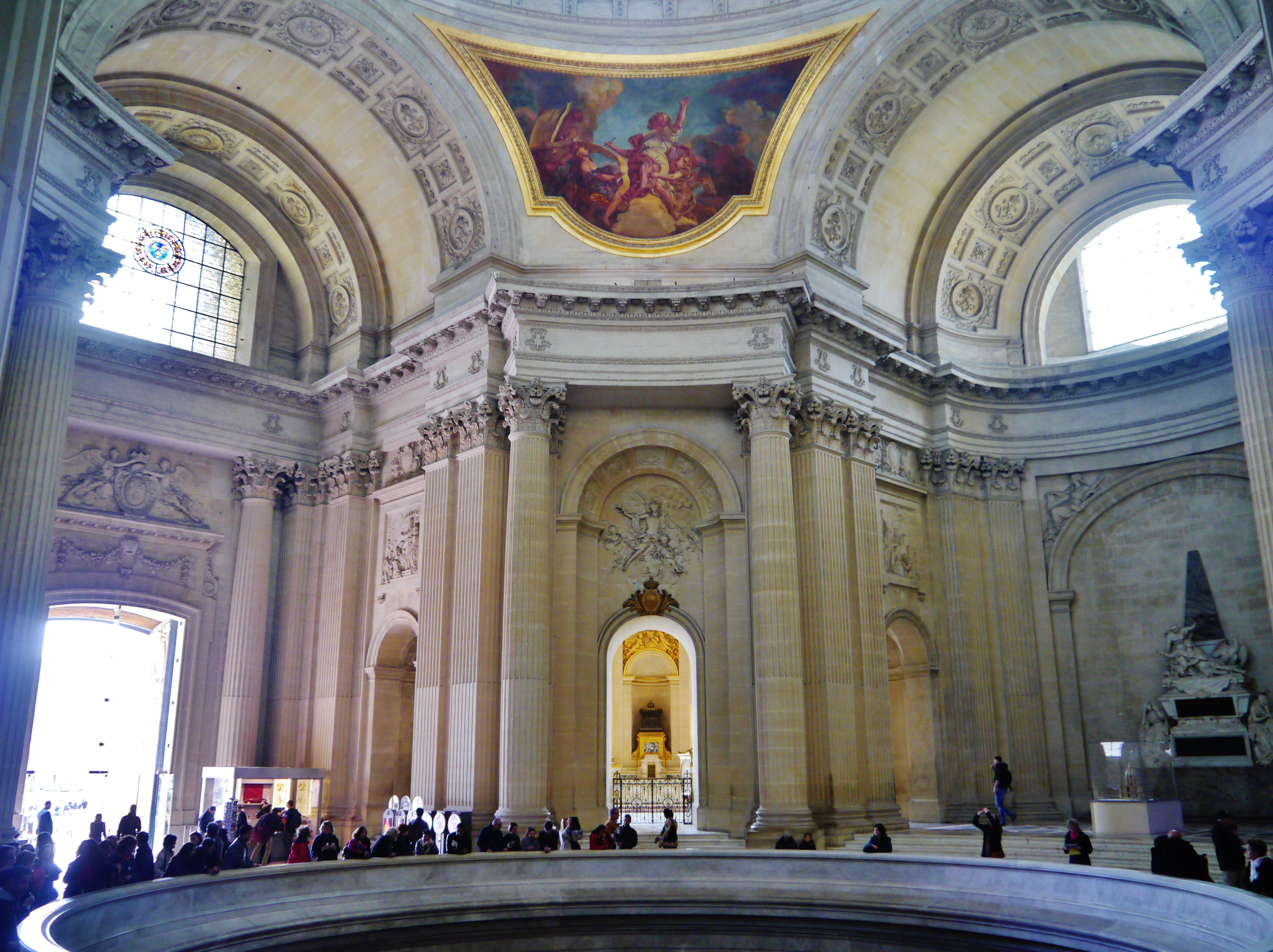
Interior of the dome with murals by Charles de la Fosse

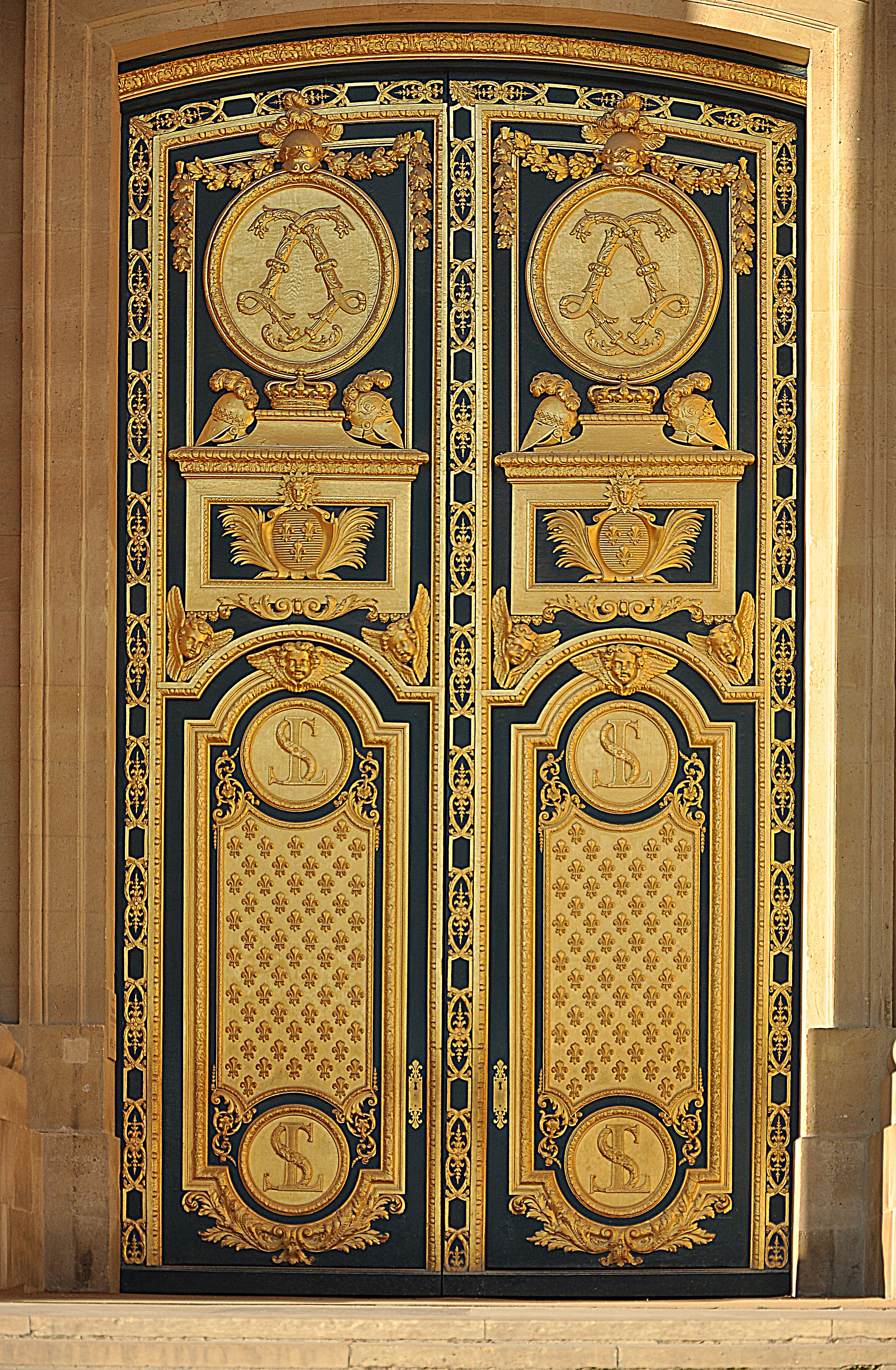
The bronze and gilded doors to the dome

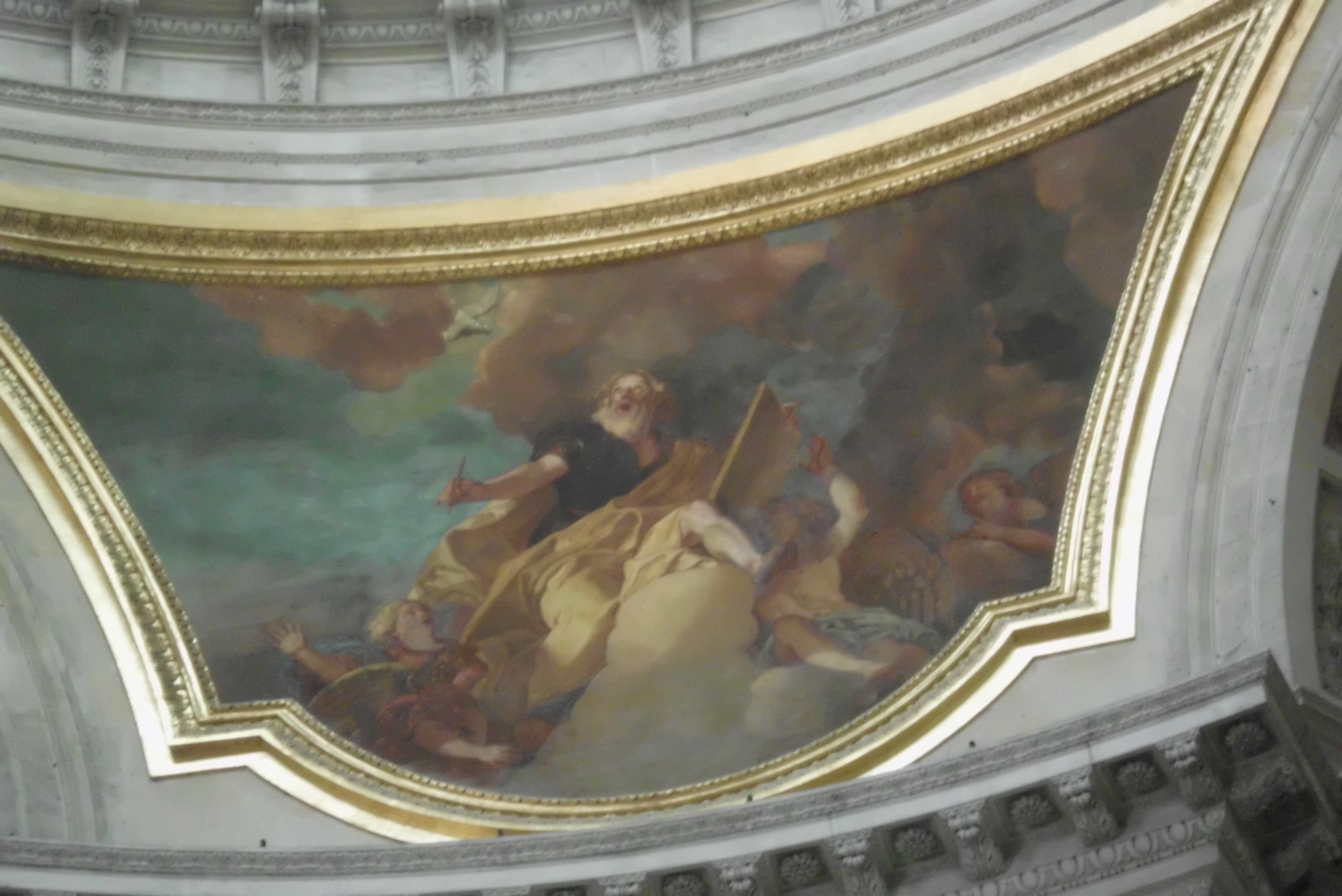
A mural by Charles de la Fosse

The Dome is the tallest and most famous of the buildings of Les Invalides. Designed by Jules Hardouin-Mansart, it takes the form of a Greek cross, on a square plan. Each of the facades is composed of two orders superimposed. The porch is topped by triangular fronton. It is crowned by a dome 90 metres high, surmounted by a lantern, bringing the total height to 107 metres (351 feet), making it taller than Notre Dame de Paris and the tallest of all Paris church domes.

The dome is actually composed of two domes superimposed. The lower dome is largely open at the base, allowed the visitors below to see the art painted on the dome above by Charles de La Fosse. The windows are masked by the lower dome, which permits natural lighting and gives the impression that viewers are actually seeing the sky, a popular Baroque effect.

The interior of the dome is divided into two separate churches; beneath the dome is the chapel that was used, on rare occasions, by the royal family. Attached to the dome is a separate church, the Cathedral of Saint-Louis-des-Invalides, Paris, which was used by the veterans who lived at Les Invalides. They were required to attend daily services in the church.

The painting inside the dome by Charles de la Fosse depicts Saint Louis presenting his sword to Christ and the angels. In the centre of the composition, God and the Virgin are surrounded by angel musicians. Saint Louis carries the symbols of royalty; a crown, a garden with flour-des-lys emblems, and a royal mantle. To the right of Christ are placed the symbols of the passion and the suffering of Christ; the cross, nails, a lance, and the crown of thorns.

Charles de la Fosse (1636-1716), a student of Le Brun, was one of the leading painters of the Academy, whose work is also found in the Palace of Versailles. Jules Hardouin Mansard, in charge of all the decoration of the dome, asked La Fosse to decorate the cupola and the pendentives with paintings of the four Evangelists. In the same period, he decorated the salons of Diane and Apollo at the Palace of Versailles.

=== Tomb of Napoleon ===
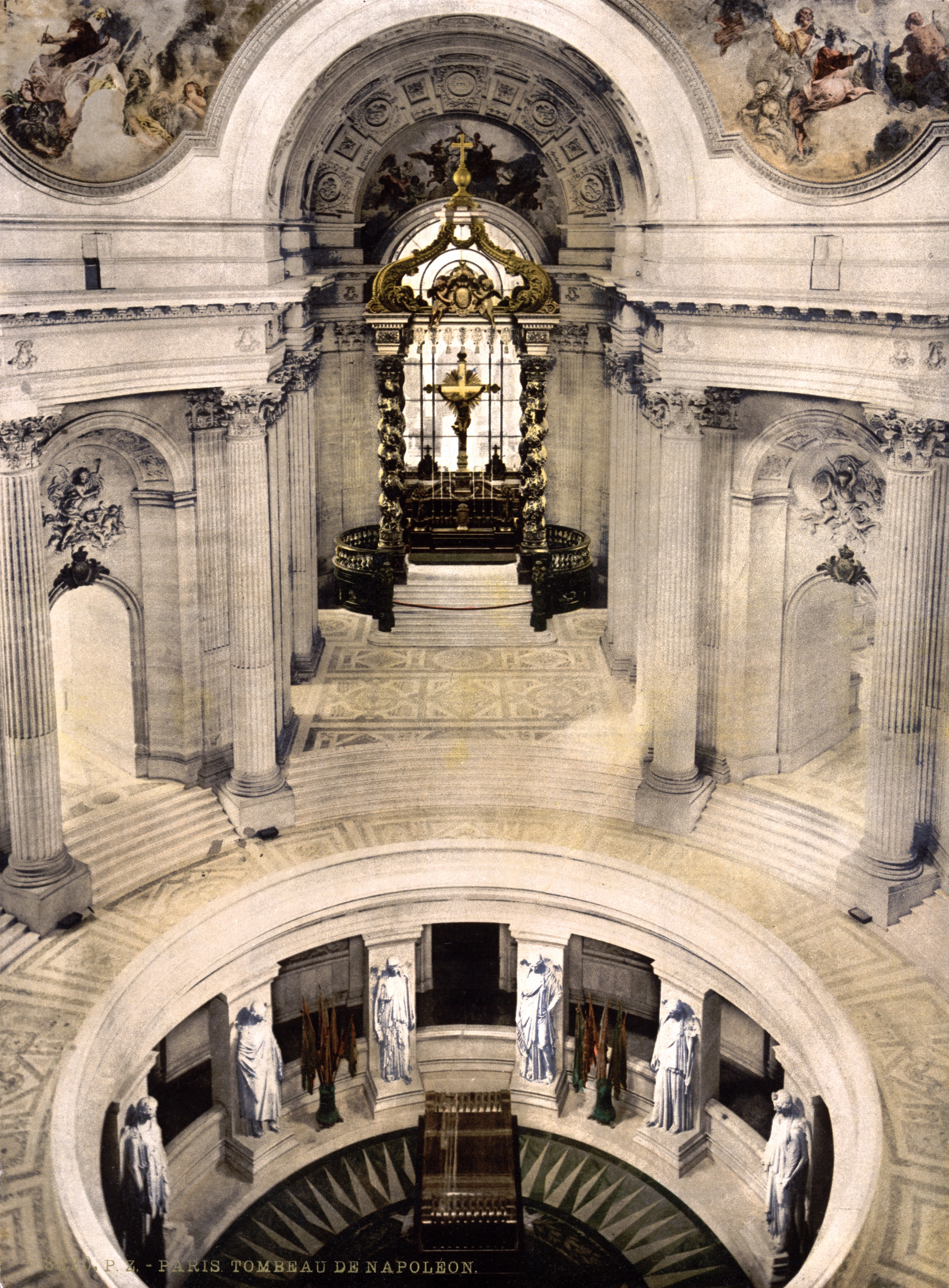
Tomb of Napoleon in a recess below the dome

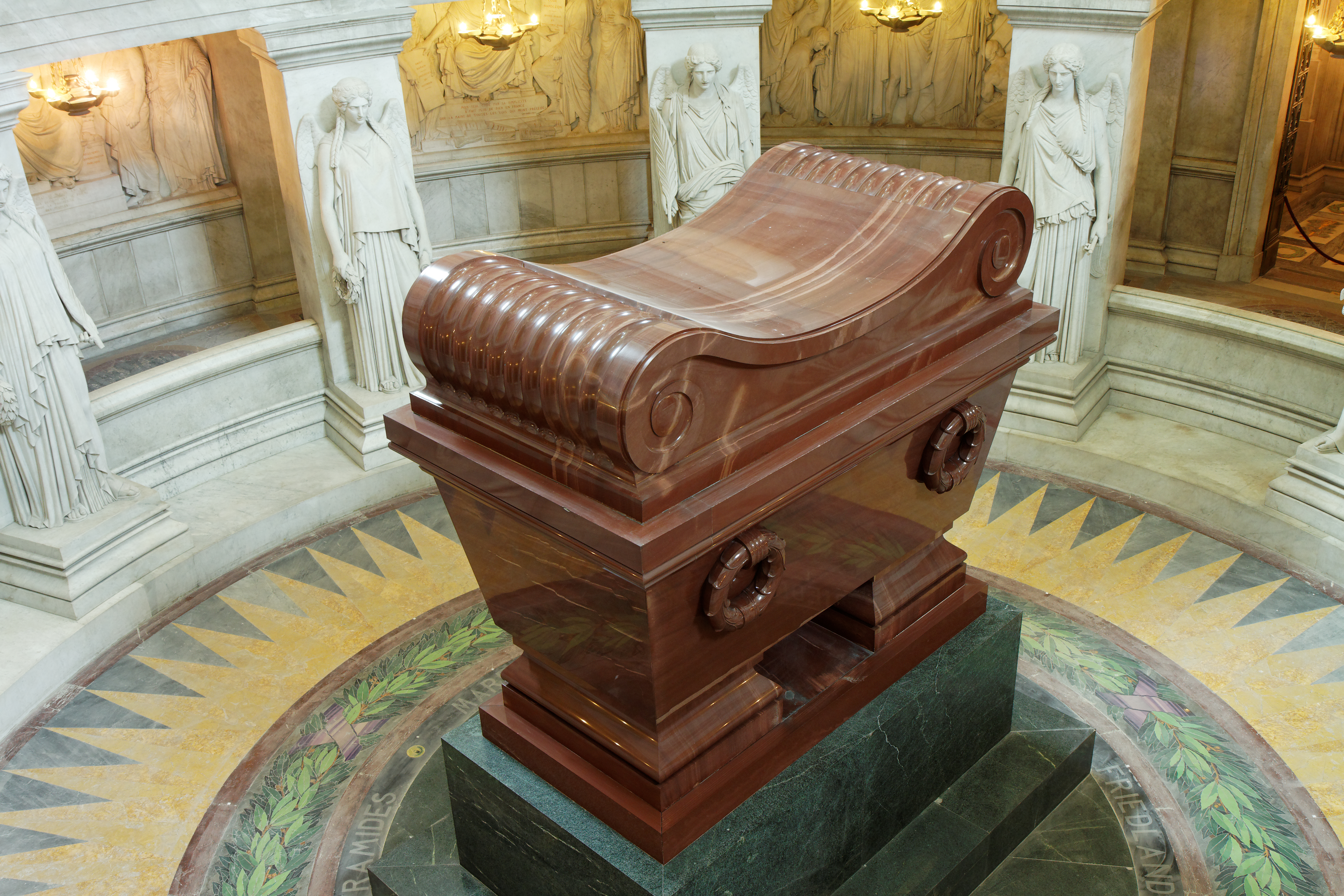
Sarcophagus of Napoleon

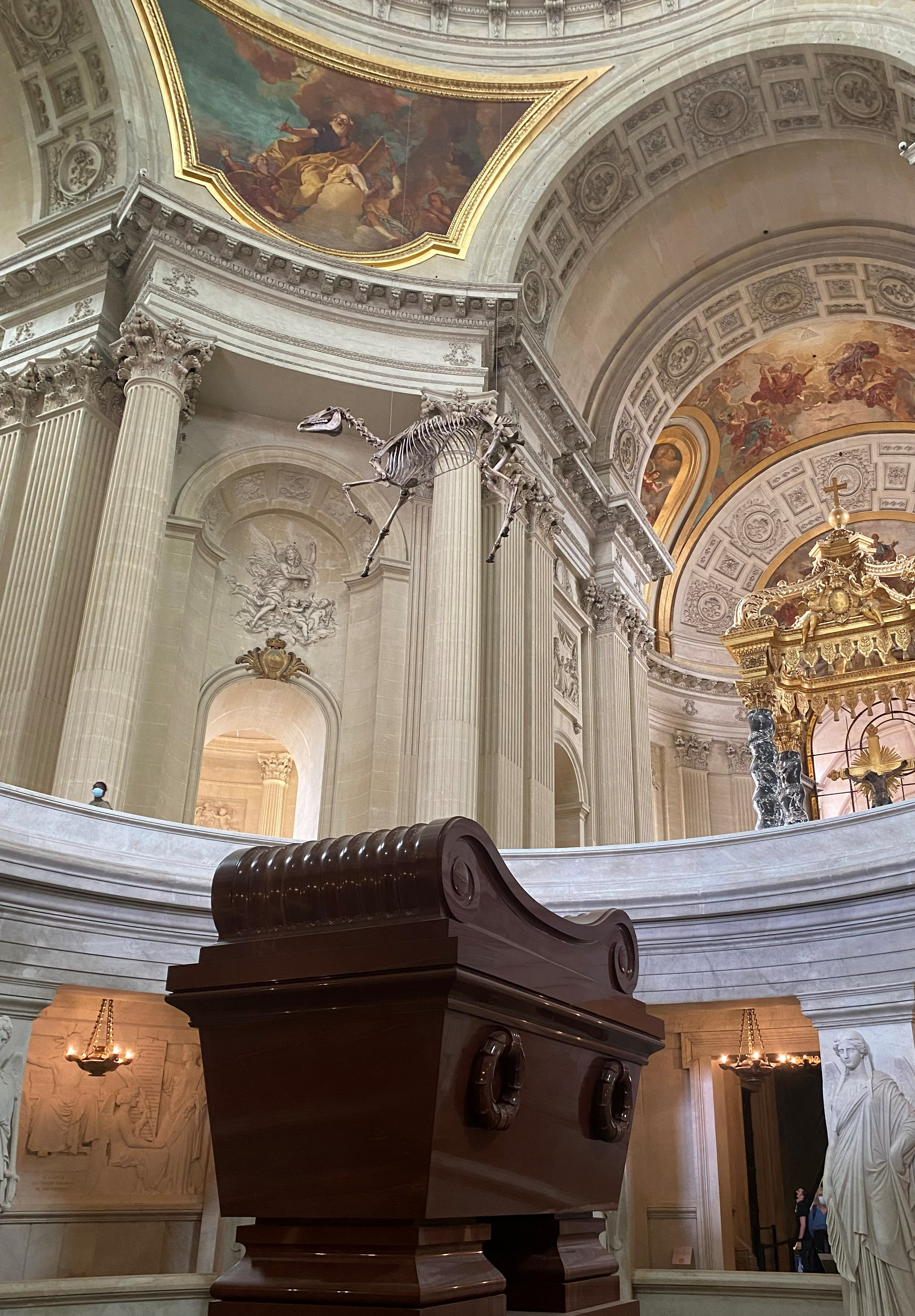
The altar above the tomb

The Tomb of Napoleon is found within the Church of the Dome. It was created after his remains were returned to France from Saint Helena in 1840. It was prepared by King Louis Philippe I and his Prime Minister, Adolphe Thiers, but it was not completed and inaugurated until 1861. The chief architect was Louis Visconti, who died before the tomb was completed. The sarcophagus made of purple quartzite, on a base of green granite, is placed in an open crypt. The crypt is surrounded by a circular gallery supported by twelve pillars, with relief panel and sculpture celebrating Napoleon's accomplishments, represented by figures of Atlantes.

=== Cathedral of Saint-Louis-des-Invalides ===
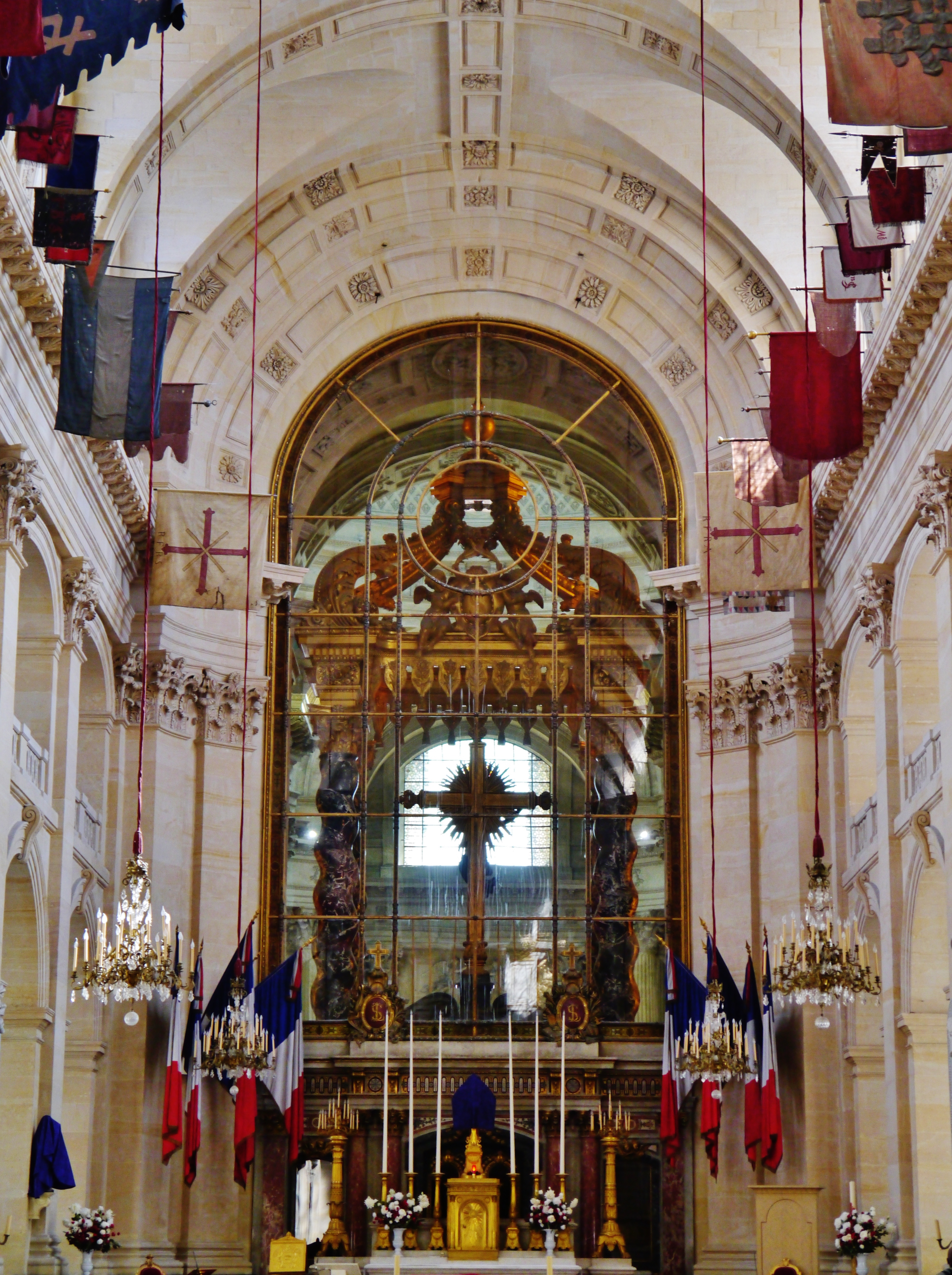
The window behind the altar looks into chapel of the dome

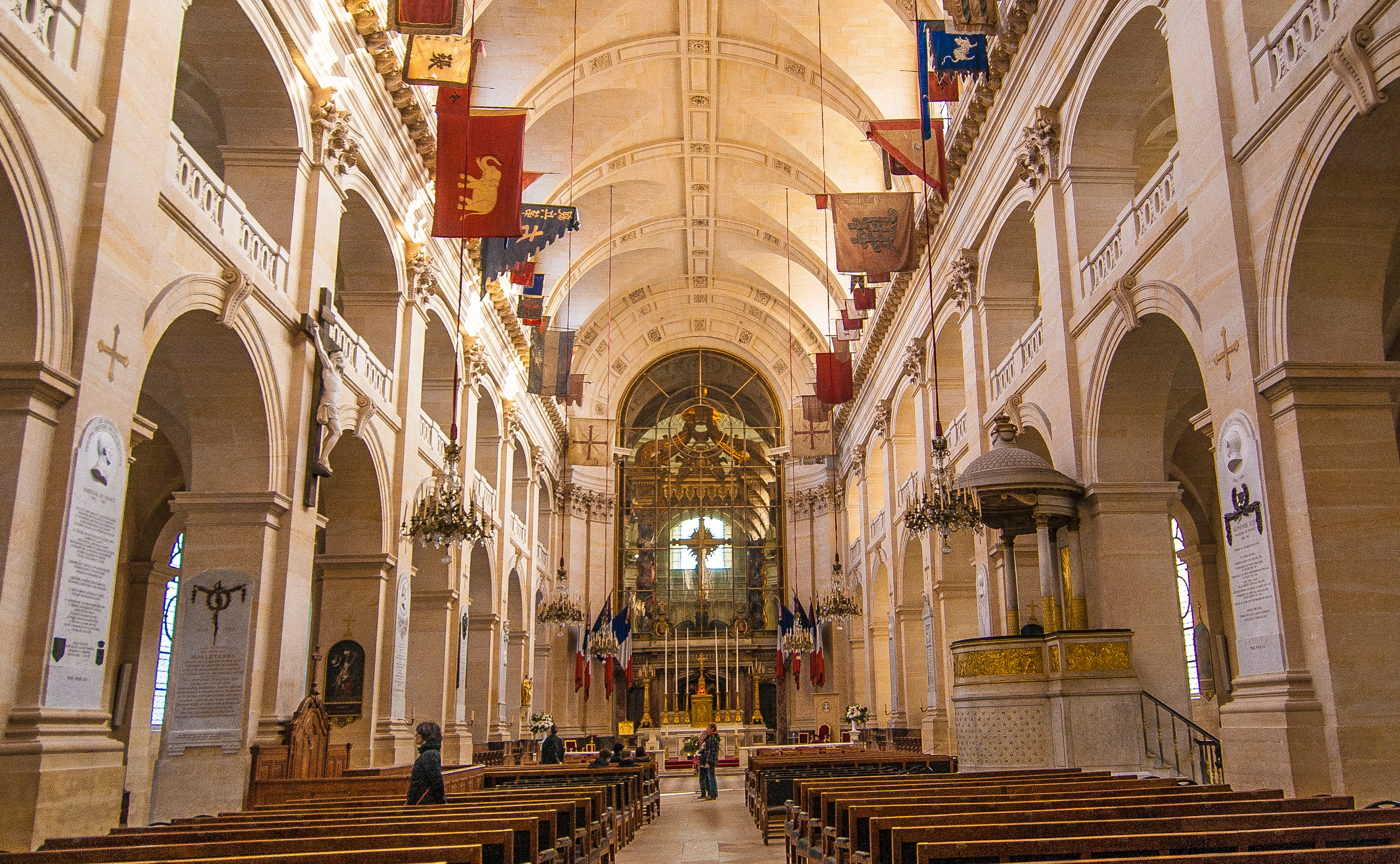
Nave with enemy flags captured by French Army

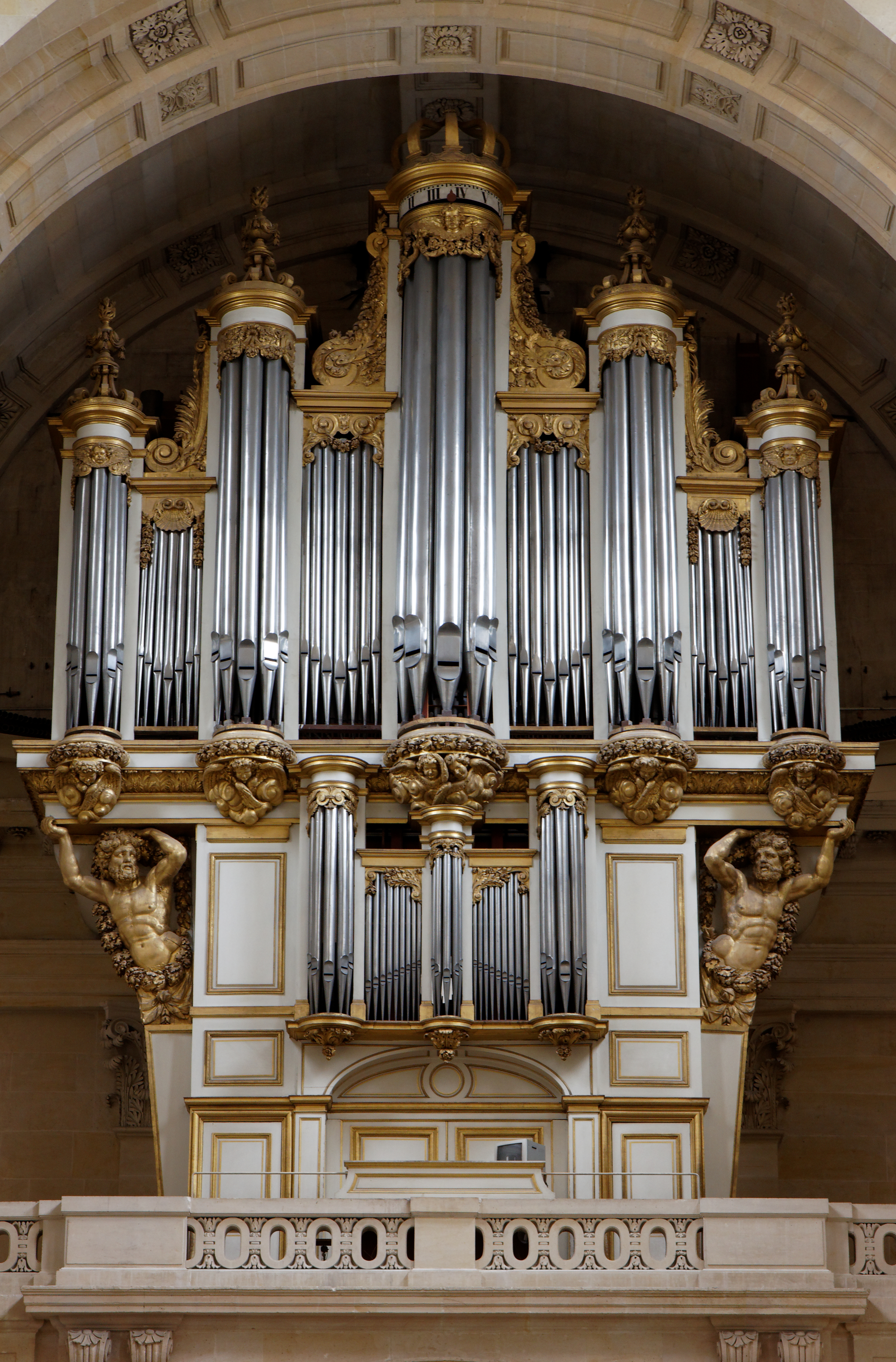
Organ with case designed by Hardouin-Mansart

In 1957, the position of vicar was created to oversee the spiritual education of the army. In 1986 a position of the Bishop of the armies was established and placed at the church, which gave the church the title of cathedral.

The church is located directly behind the Dome des Invalides. It was originally the church that was used by the army veterans who lived at Les Invalides. They were required to attend daily services in the cathedral. In the original church, the dome, where the royal family worshipped, served as the choir, while the present cathedral was the nave for the veterans.

One unusual feature of the church is the display of captured enemy flags taken over the years by the French Army.

The cathedral has a particularly fine organ, made between 1679 and 1687, with a vert elaborate case with sculpture designed by architect Jules Hardouin-Mansart.

=== The Courtyard of Honour ===
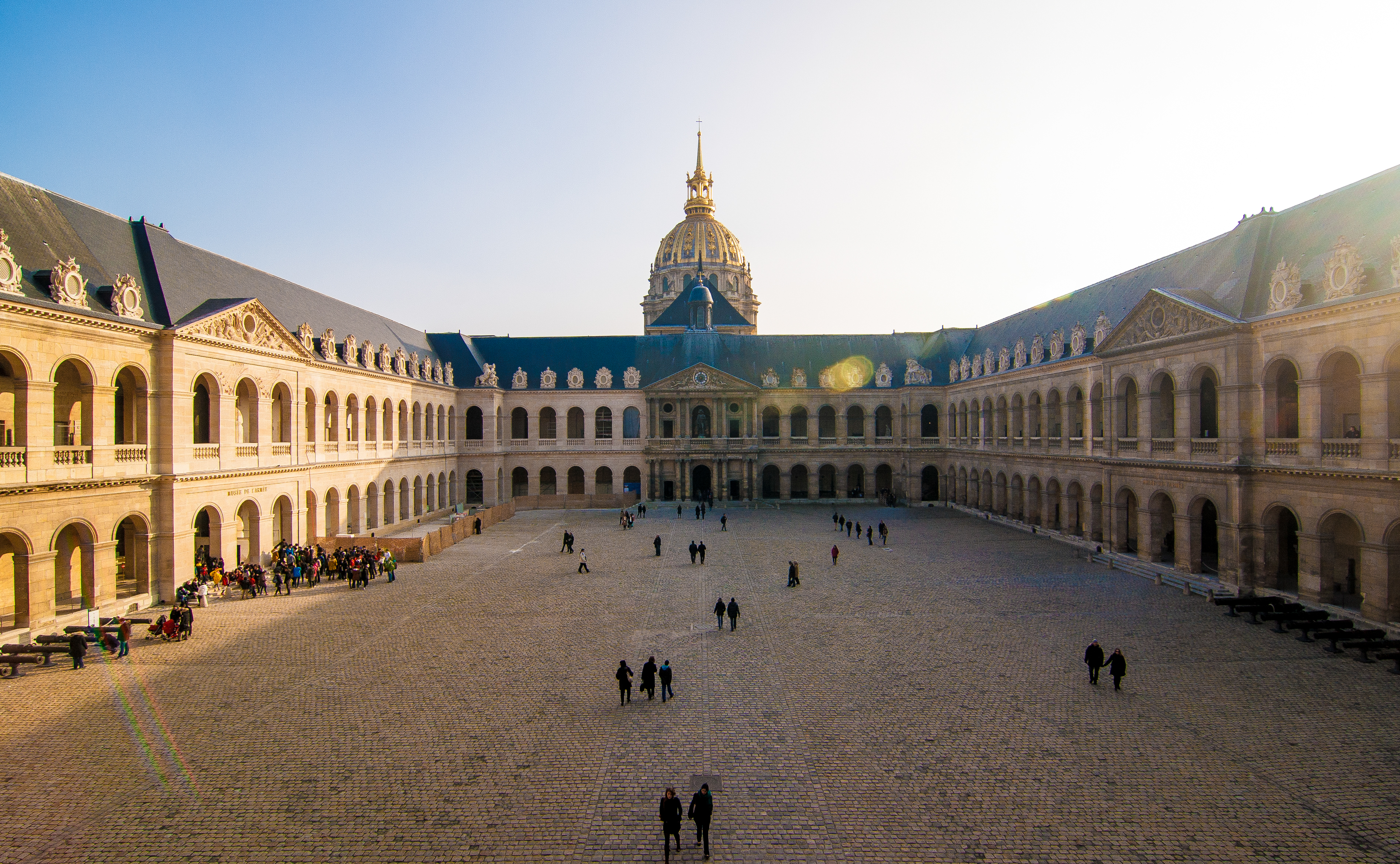
Courtyard of Honour, with the Dome behind it. The Army Museum is on the left.

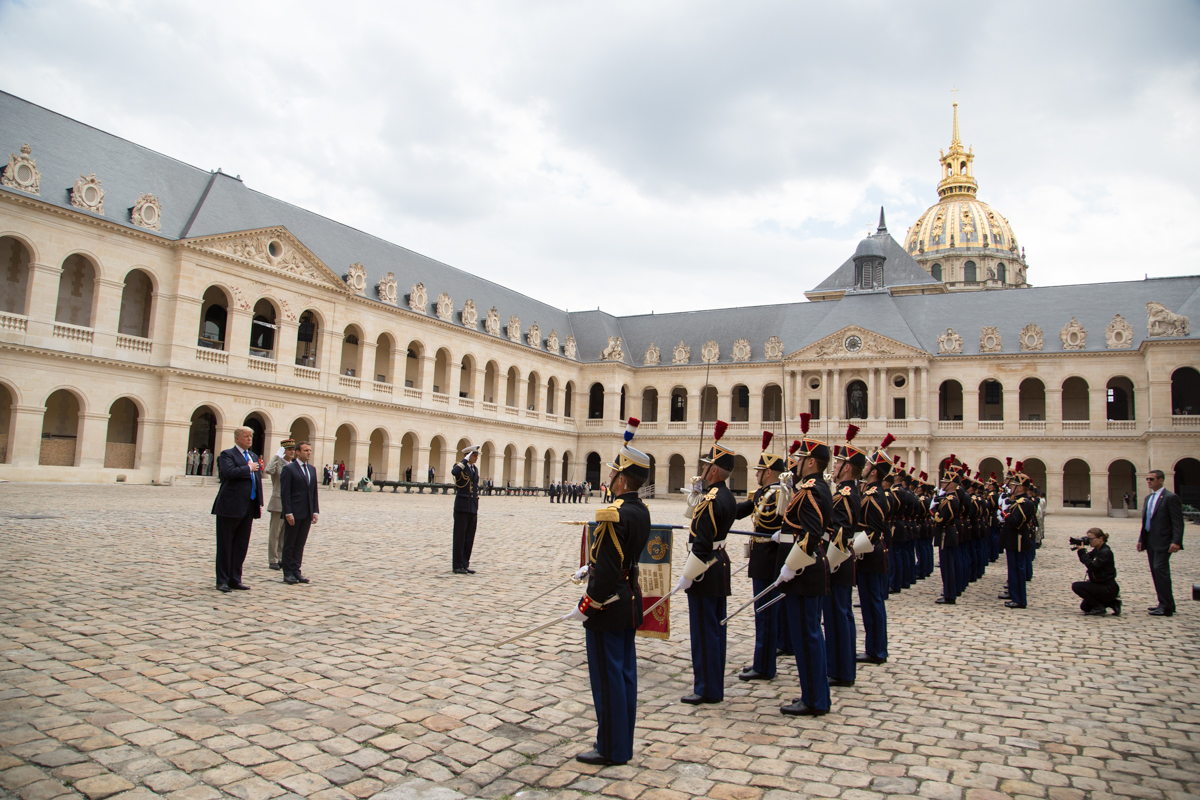
President Macron welcomes President Trump to Les Invalides (July 17, 2017)

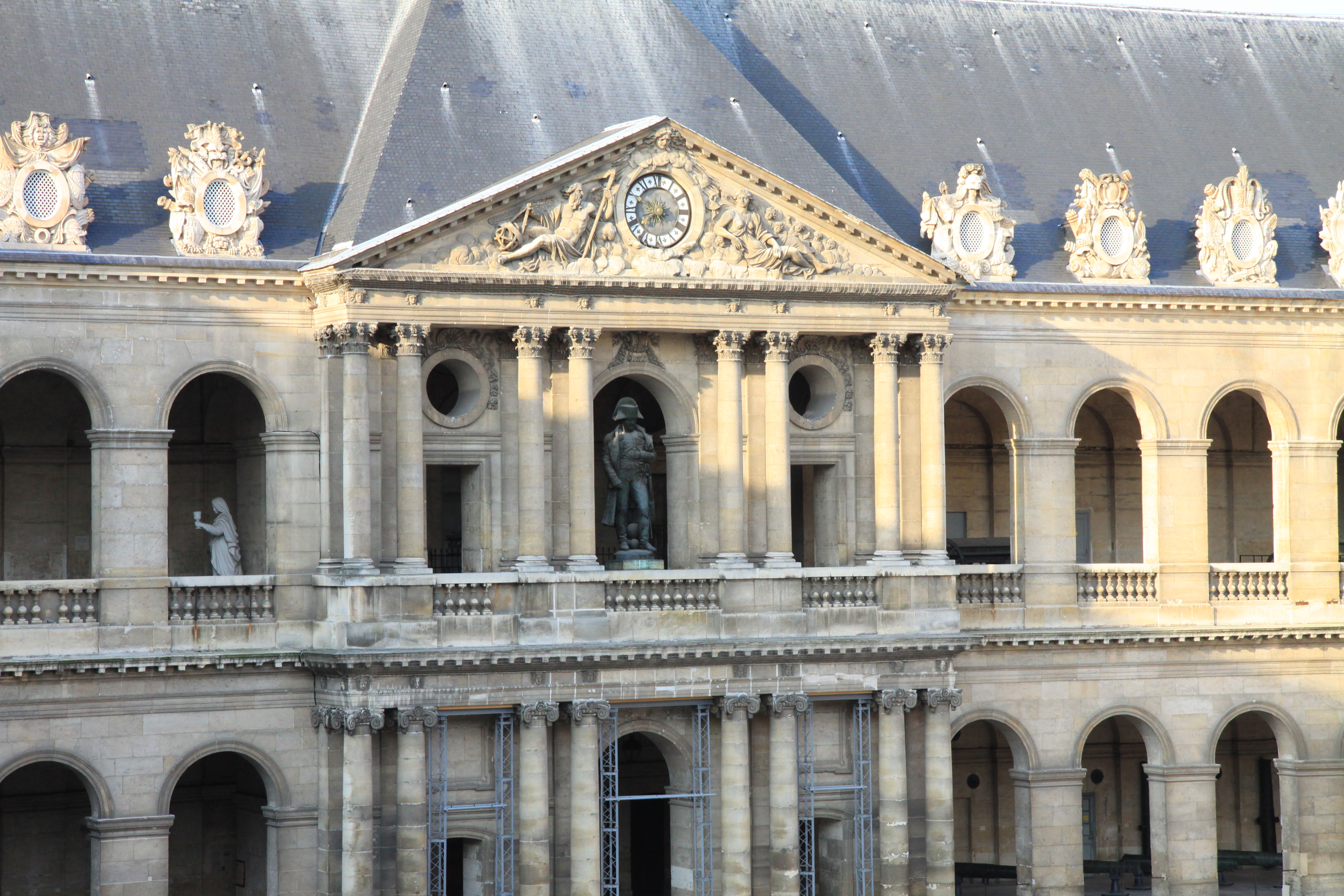
Entrance to the Army Museum on the Courtyard of Honour

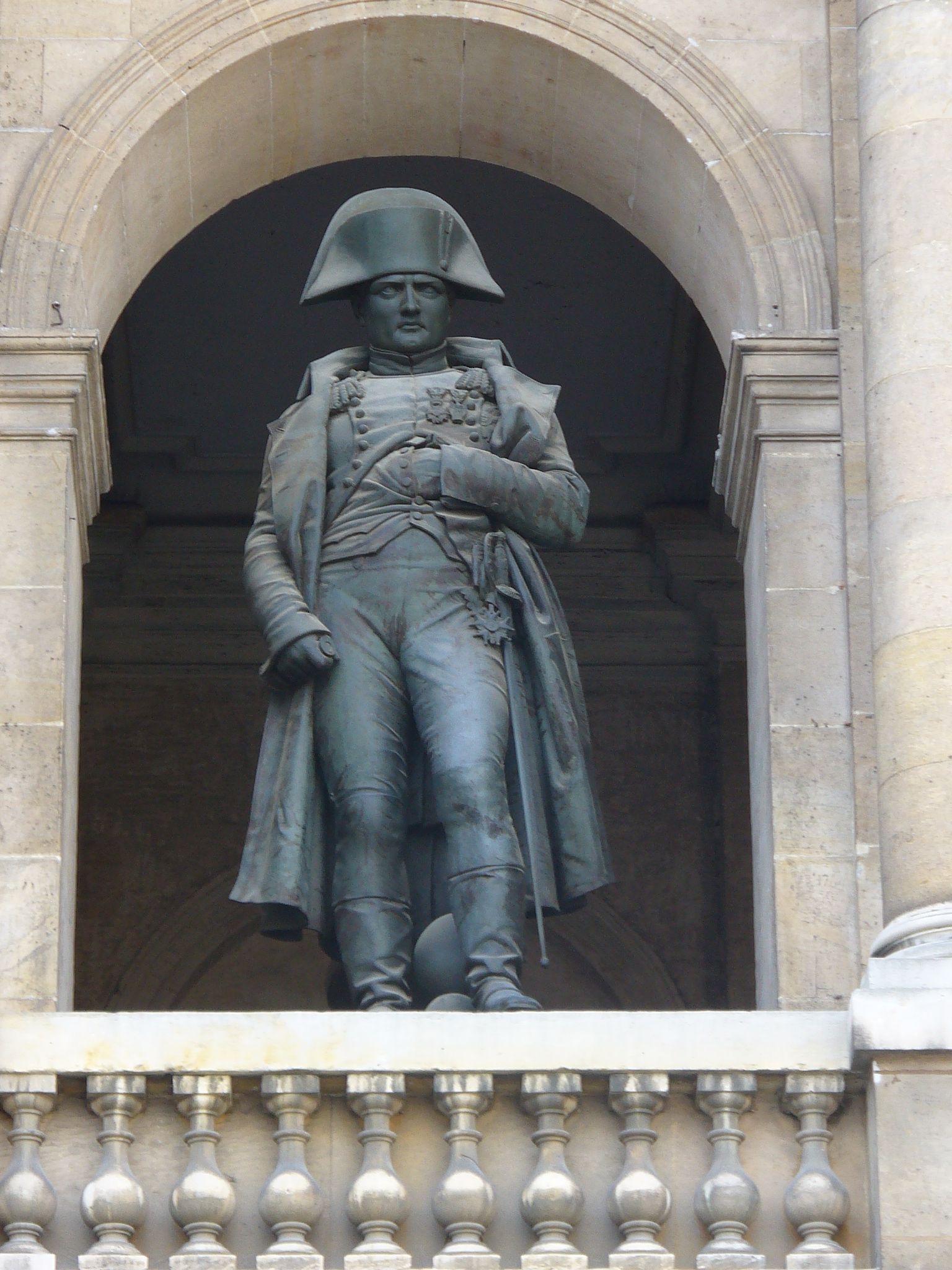
Statue of Napoleon overlooking the courtyard

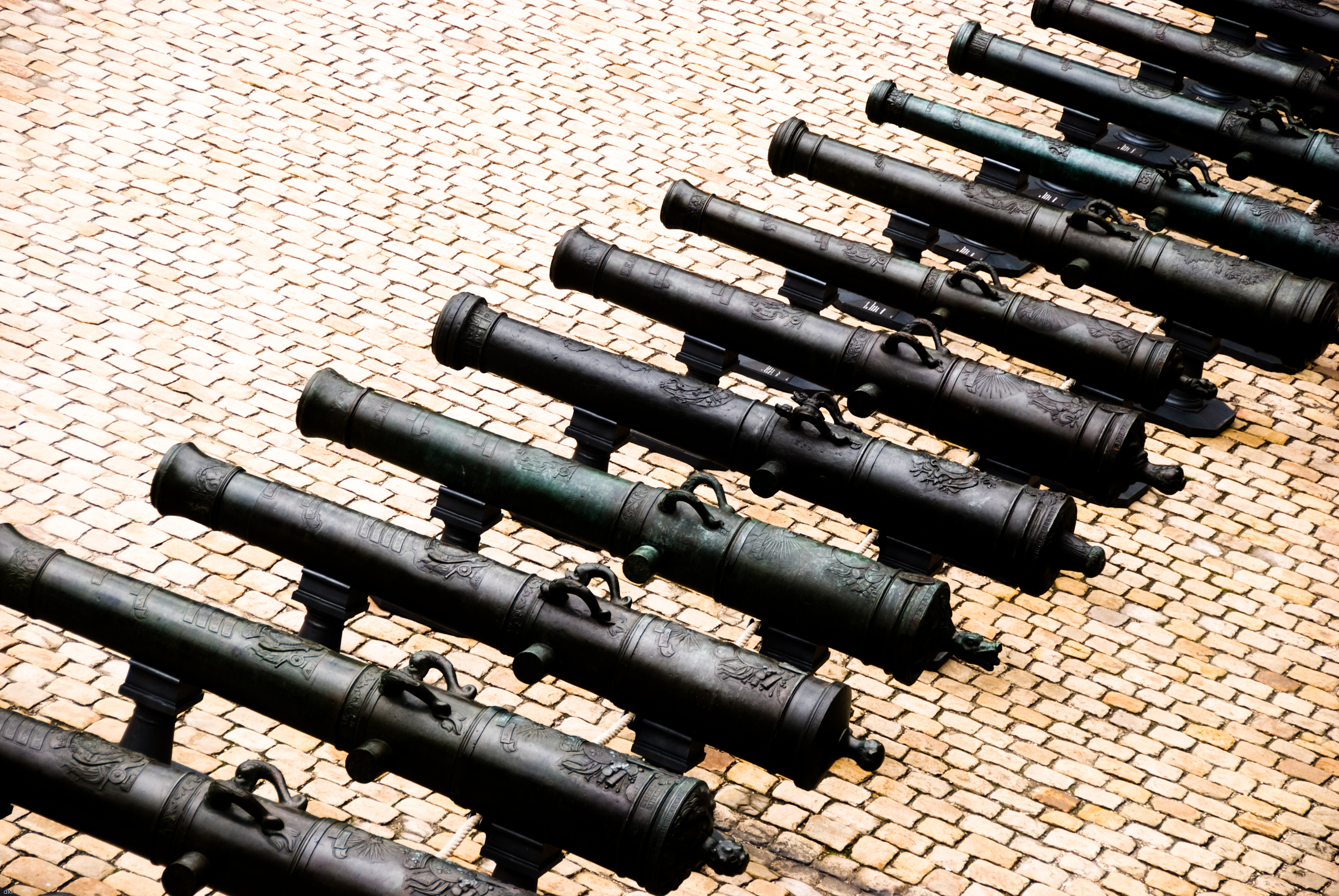
Cannons on display in the courtyard

The organ of the cathedral is particularly notable. It was made by the organ-builder of the King, Alexandre Thierry, between 1679 and 1687, and has undergone several restorations. The elaborate buffet with sculpture was made in 1683. It was specially designed for the church by the architect, Jules Hardouin-Mansart.

== The French Army Museum ==
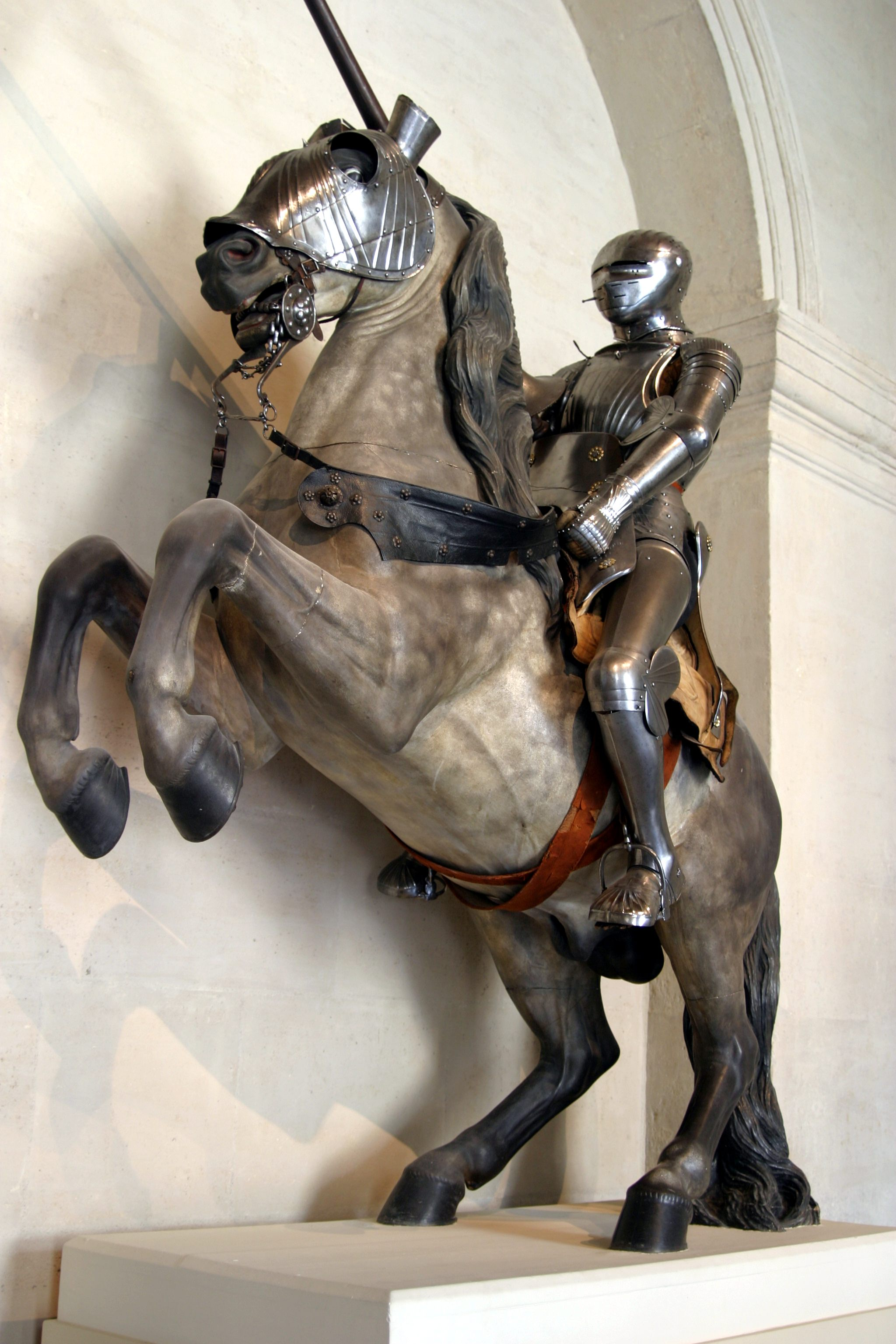
15th or 16th century cavalry armour

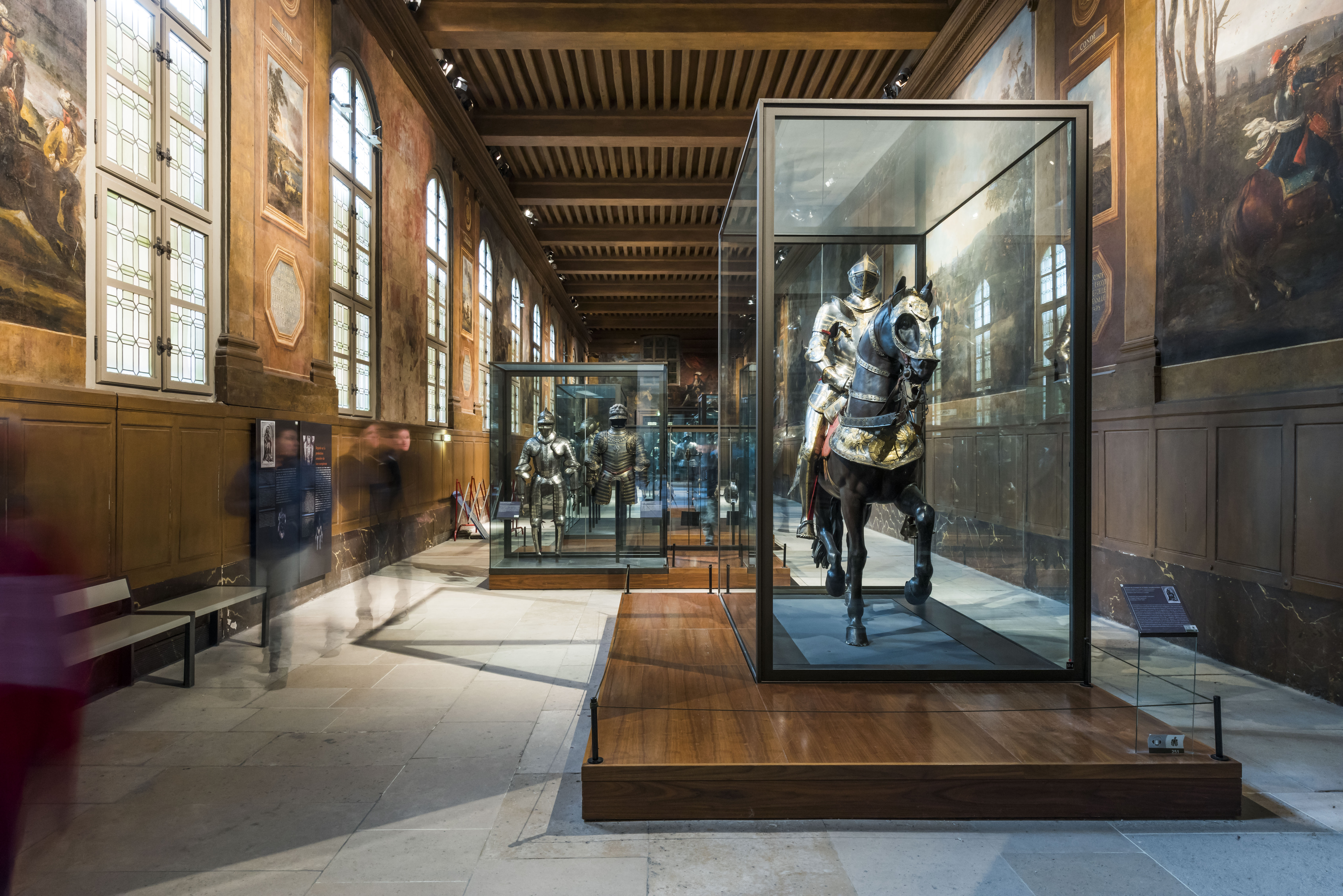
Displays in Army Museum

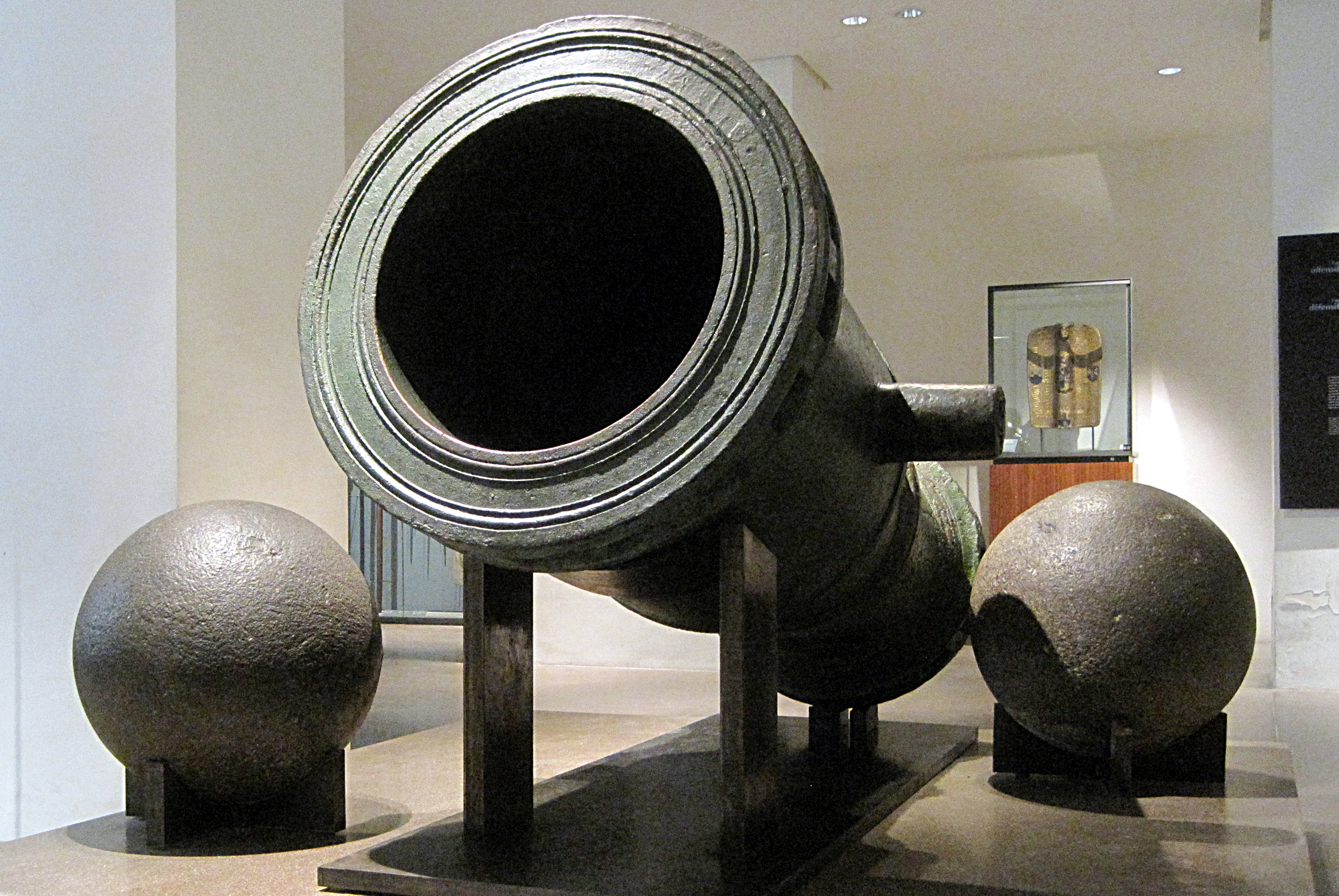
An Aubusson bombardment mortar, the largest in the world

The Army Museum (Musée de l'Armée) was created in 1905 with the merger of the Musée d'Artillerie and the Musée Historique de l'Armée. The museum's seven main spaces and departments contain collections that display military equipment spanning from the Middle antiquity through the 20th century.

== The Museum of Relief Maps ==
The Musee des Plans-Reliefs displays a collection of military models. It was begun in 1668 the Minister of War of Louis XIV ordered that three-dimensional models be made of fortified cities and strategic places in France. The models were originally held in the Louvre. The collection was enlarged through the 18th centuries, and some models of German fortifications were added. The total collection made between 1668 and 1870 has about 150 models. The museum currently displays some twenty-eight models, depicting fortified cities of the French coast.

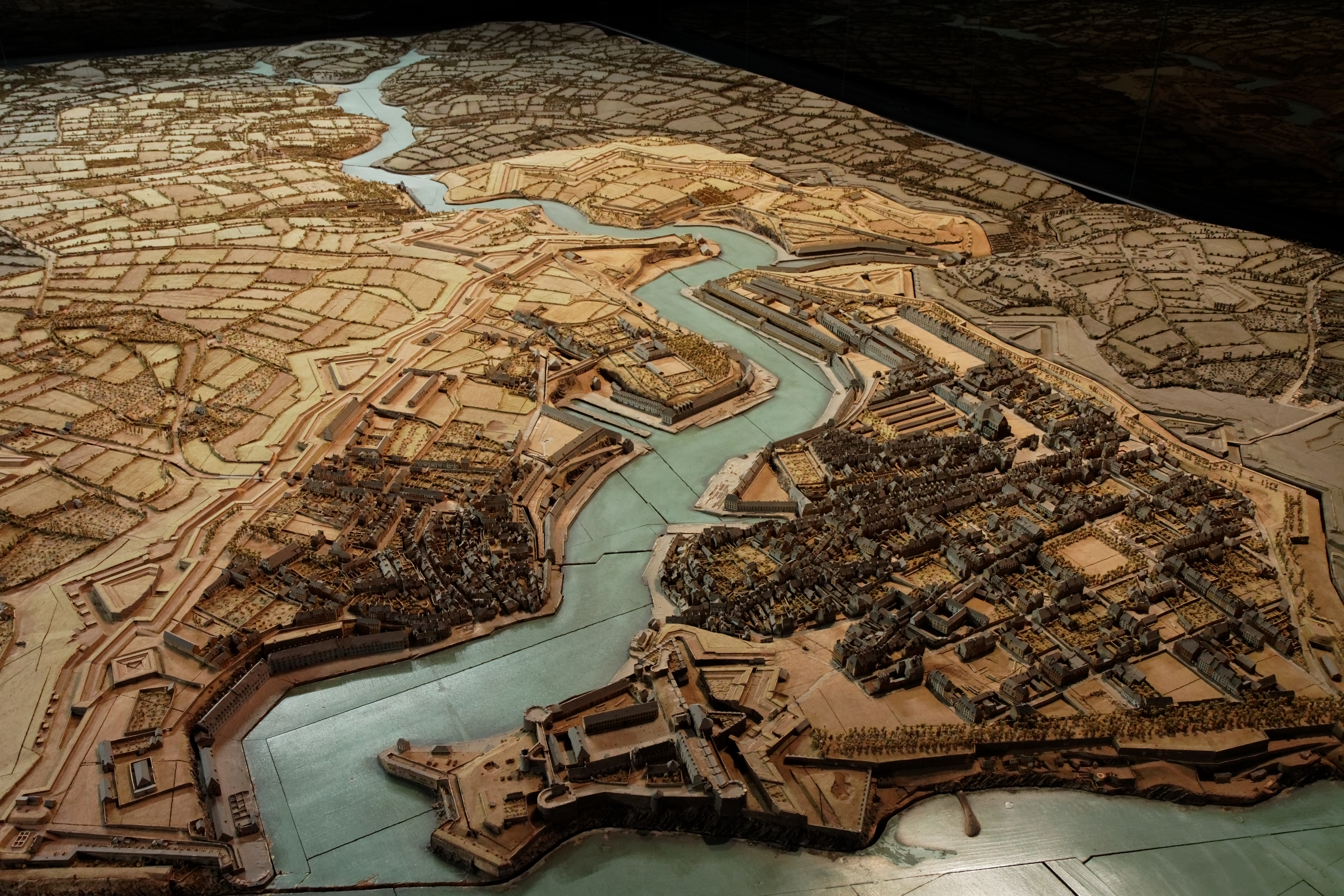
Relief plan of Brest.

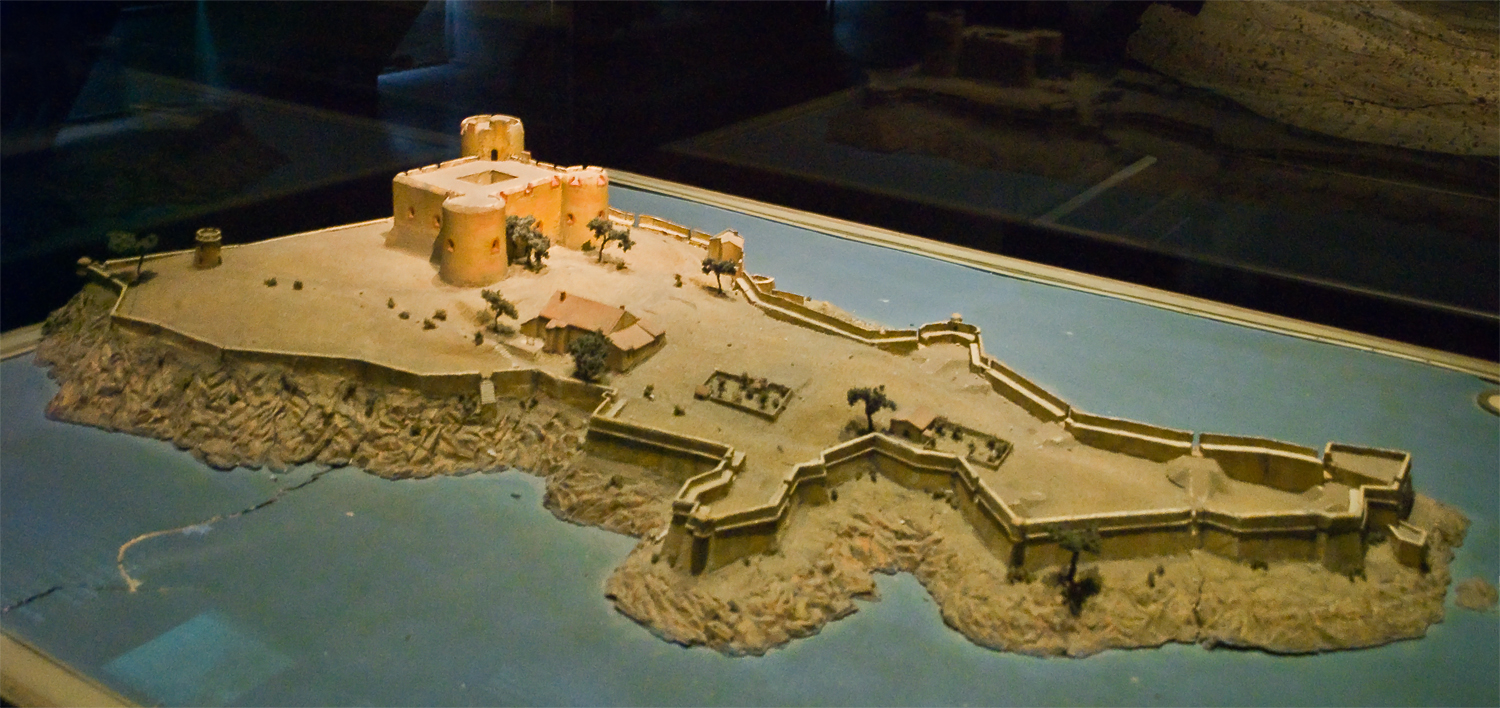
Relief map of the Chateau d'If.

== Plan of Les Invalides ==
Le plan de l'Hôtel des Invalides

Dome of Les Invalides
Cathedral of Saint-Louis-des-Invalides, Paris
Musée de l'Armée
Musée des Plans-Reliefs
Musée de l'Ordre de la Libération
Institution nationale des Invalides
Gouverneur des Invalides
Gouverneur militaire de Paris
Chancellerie de l'Ordre de la Libération
Office national des anciens combattants et victimes de guerre
- 1. Cour d'honneur
- 2. Cour d'Angoulème
- 3. Cour d'Austerlitz
- 4. Cour de la Victoire
- 5. Cour de la Valeur
- 6. Cour de Mars
- 7. Cour de Toulon
- 8. Cour de Nismes
- 9. Cour de Metz
- 10. Cour de l'Infirmerie
- 11. Cour d'Oran
- 12. Cour de la Paix
- 13. Cour d'Arles
- 14. Cour d'Alger
- 15. Cour Saint-Louis
- 16. Cour Saint-Joseph
- 17. Cour Saint-Jacques

Hardouin-Mansart's Dome chapel is large enough to dominate the long façade yet harmonizes with Bruant's door under an arched pediment on the north front of Les Invalides. To the north, the courtyard (cour d'honneur) is extended by a wide public esplanade (Esplanade des Invalides) where the embassies of Austria and Finland are neighbors of the French Ministry of Foreign Affairs, all forming one of the grand open spaces in the heart of Paris. At its far end, the Pont Alexandre III links this grand urbanistic axis with the Petit Palais and the Grand Palais. The Pont des Invalides is next, downstream the Seine river.

The buildings still comprise the Institution Nationale des Invalides, a national institution for disabled war veterans. The institution comprises:

- a retirement home
- a medical and surgical centre
- a centre for external medical consultations.

=== Gallery ===
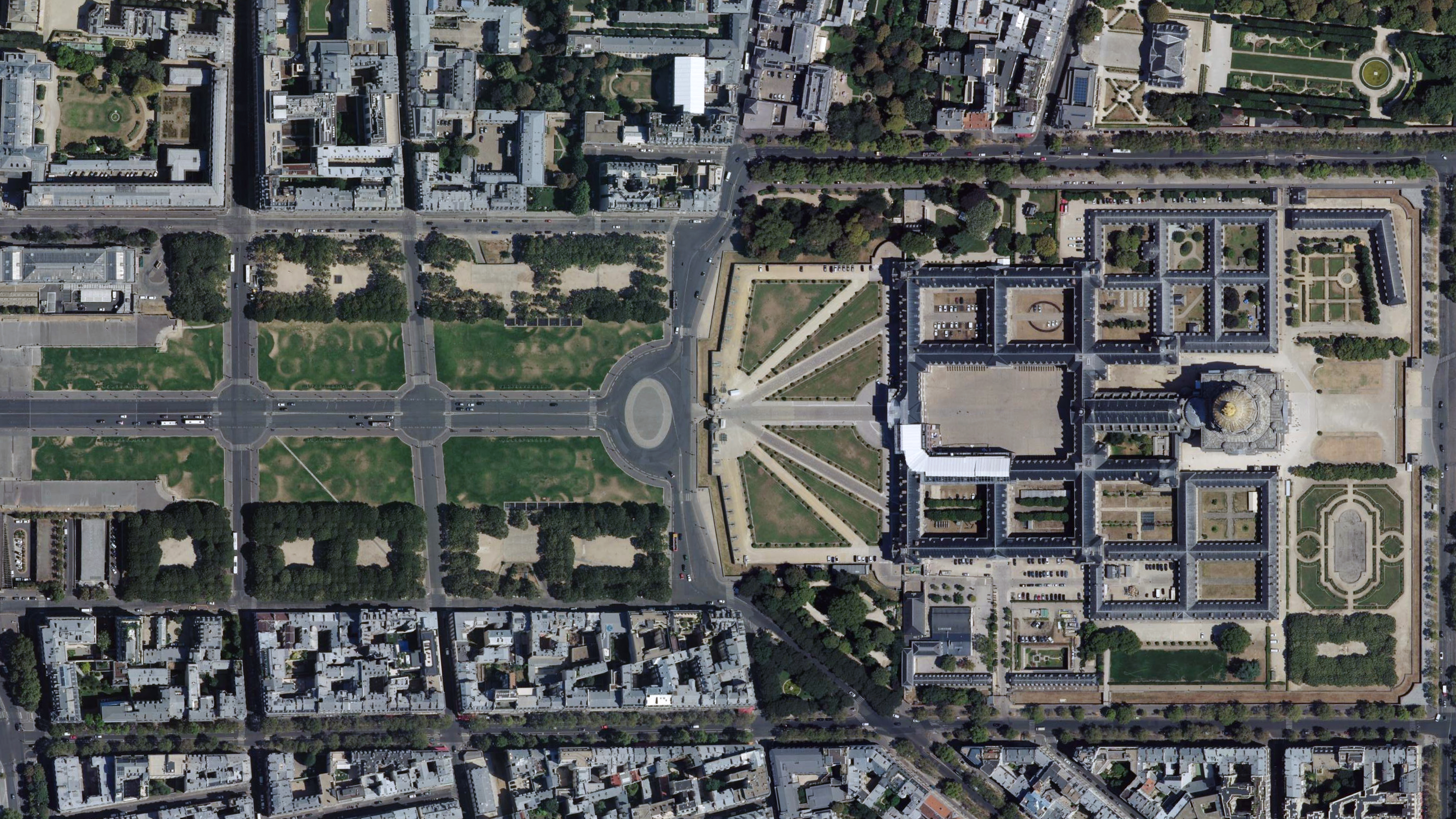
Aerial view of Les Invalides

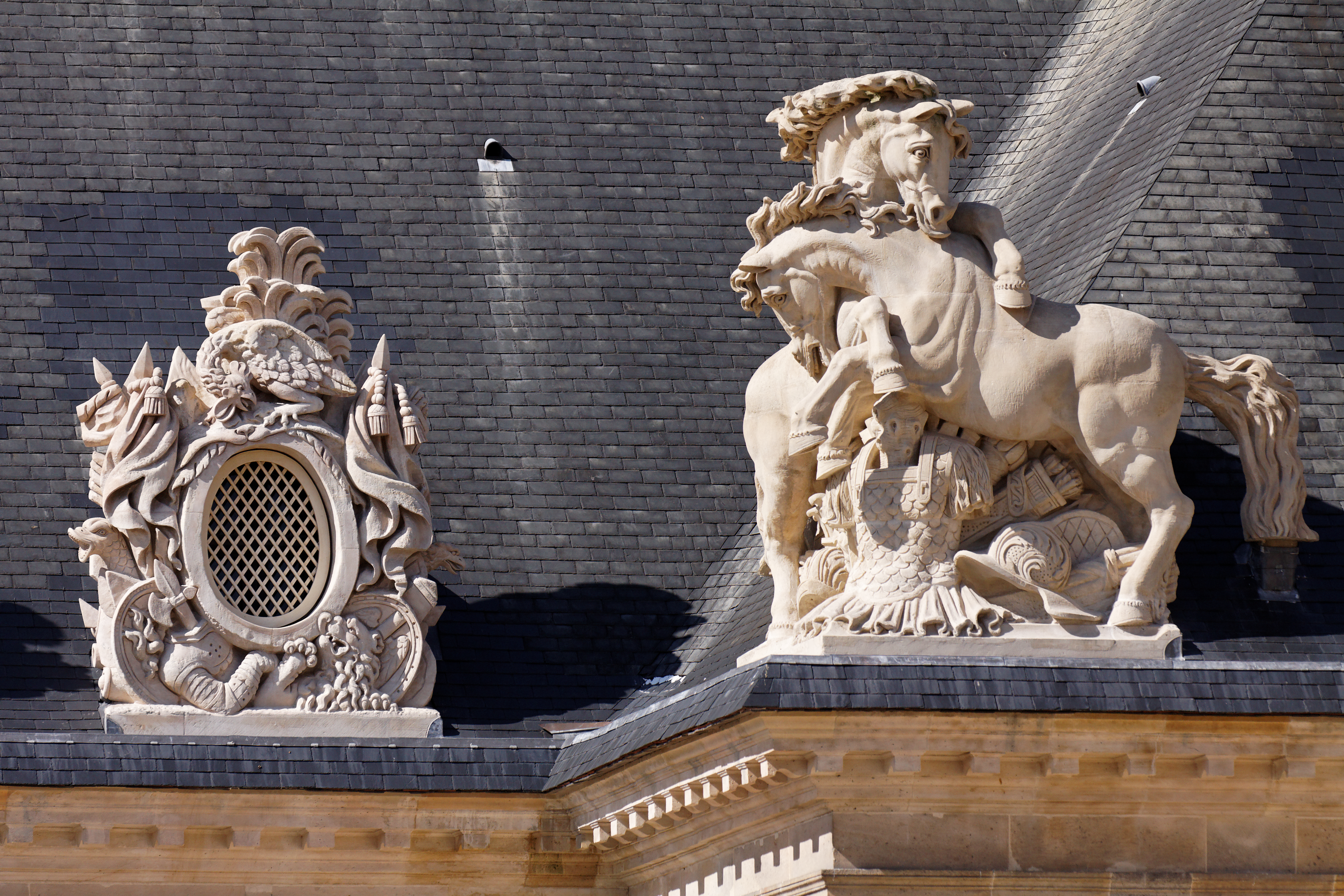
Statue and attic window in the court of honor

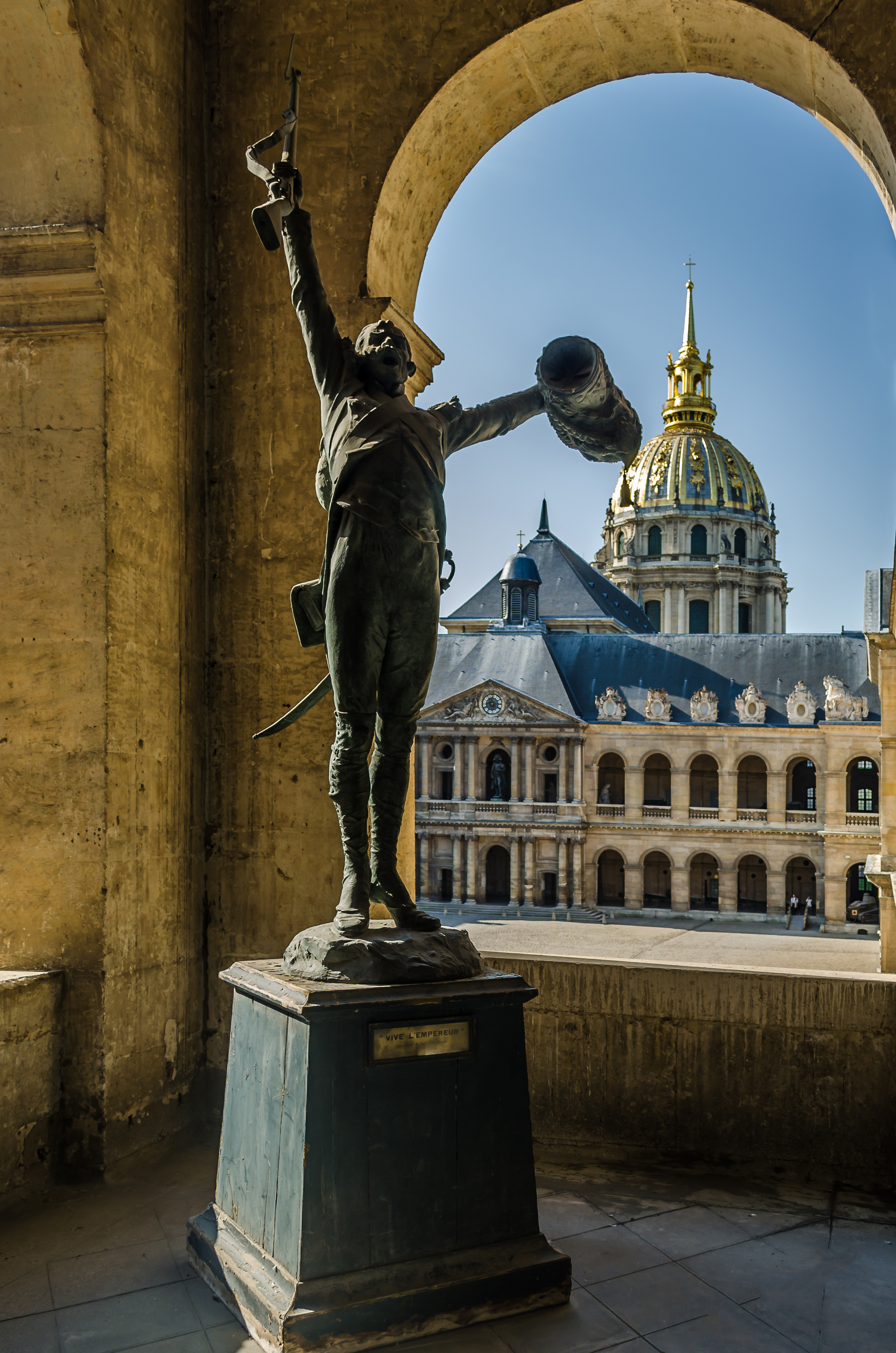
"Long Live the Emperor" in the court

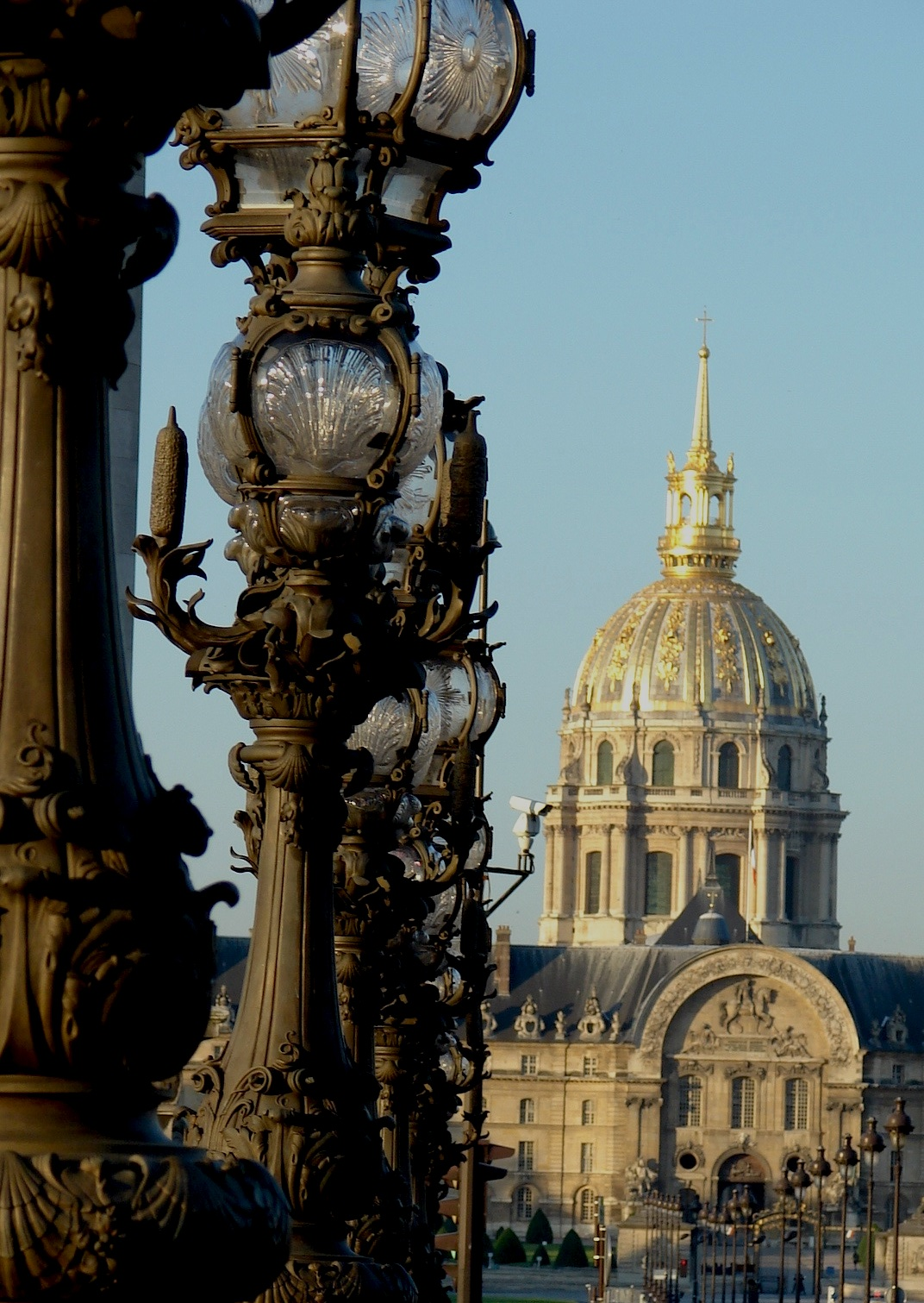
The Alexander III bridge was built in alignment with Les Invalides

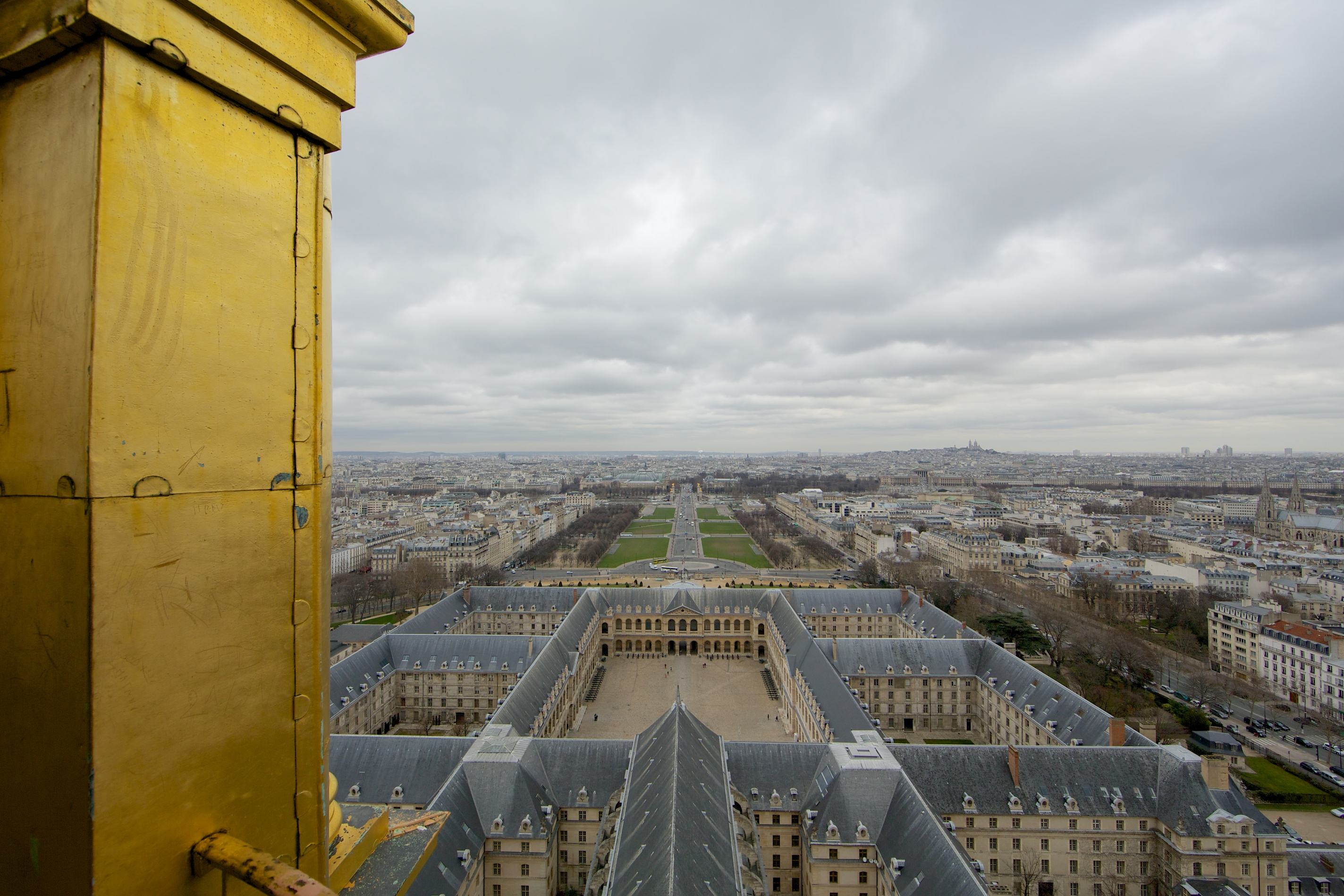
Sight on the complex and Paris from the Dome's top

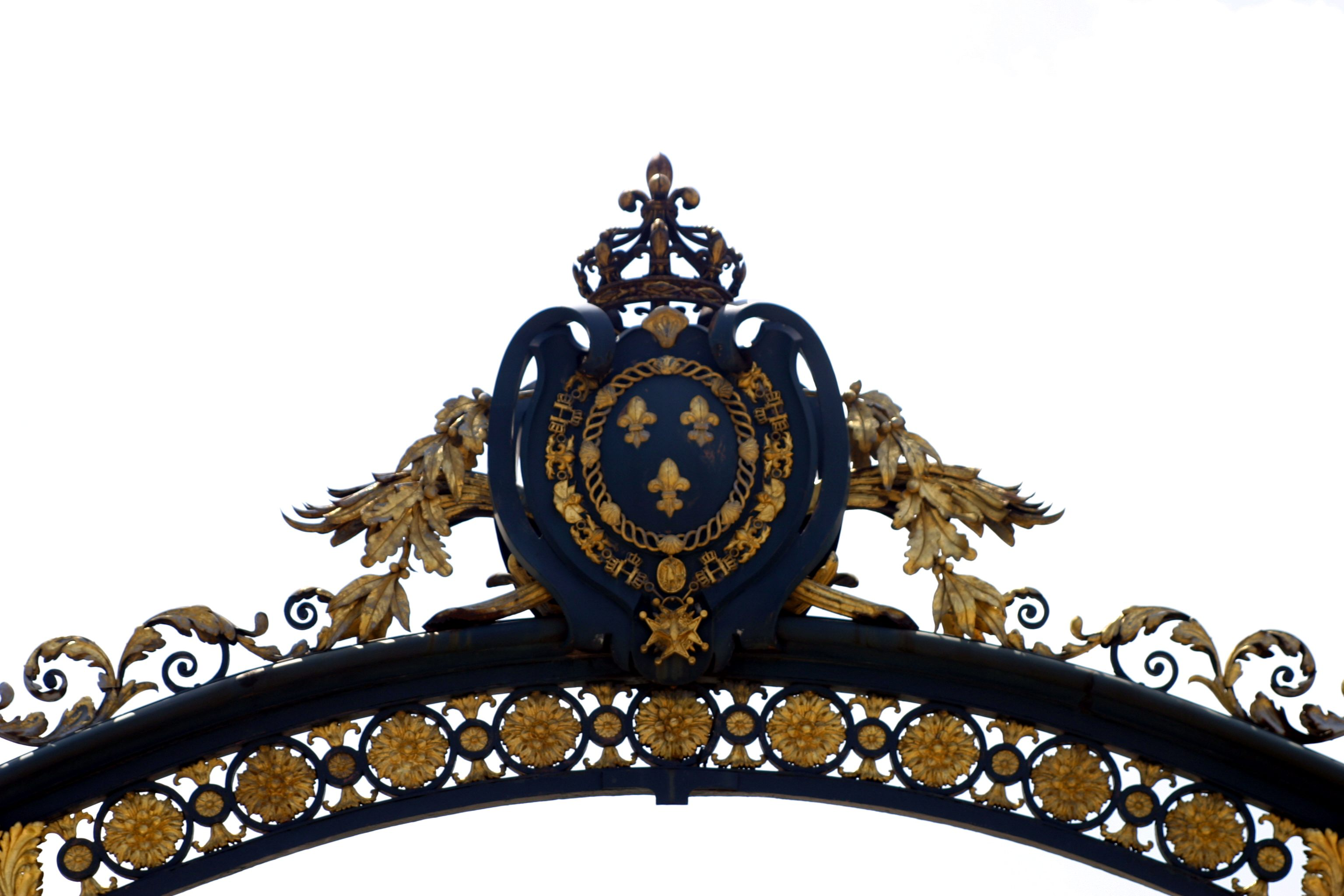
Top of the gate that overlooks the northern esplanade

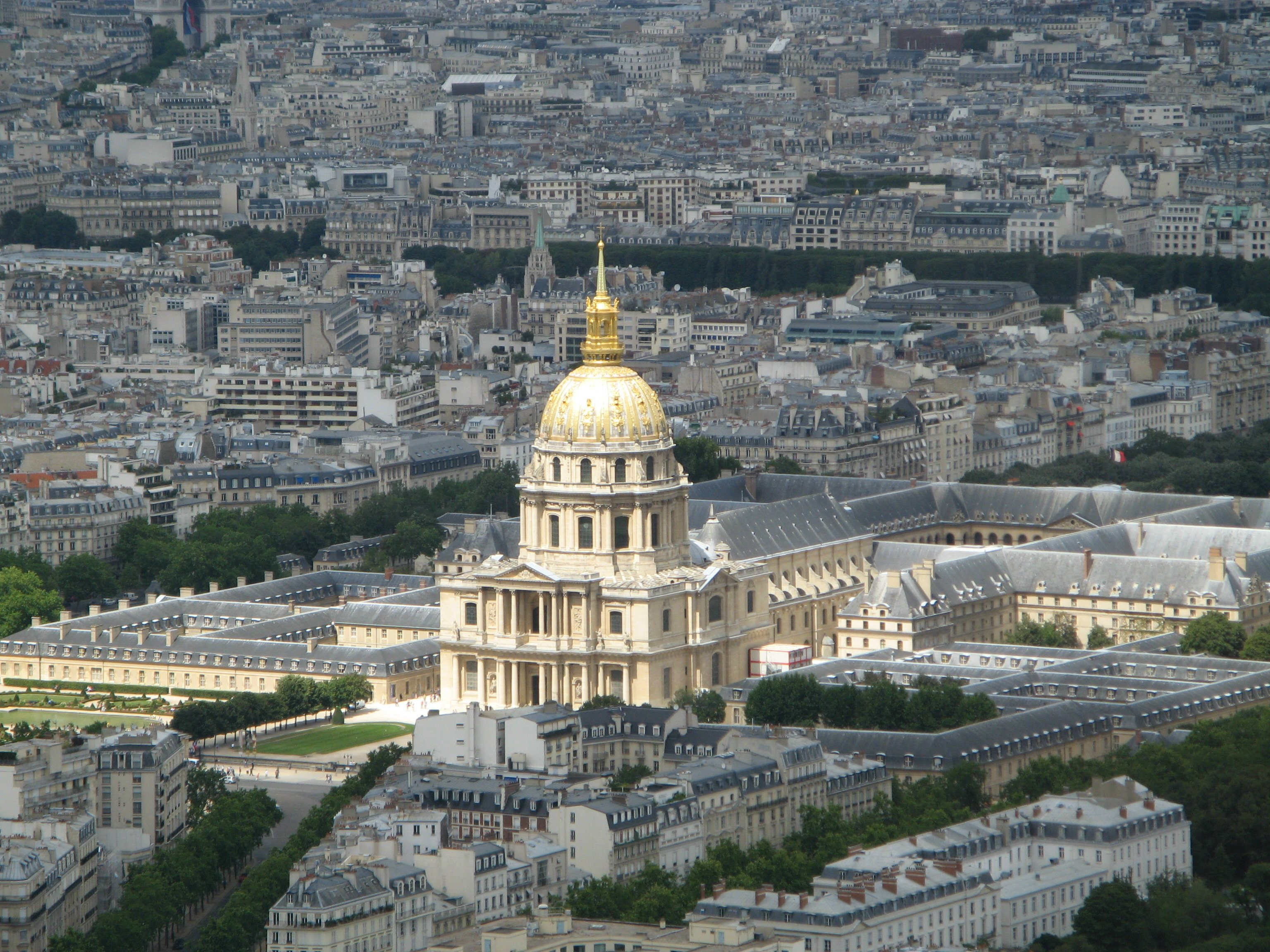
From Montparnasse tower

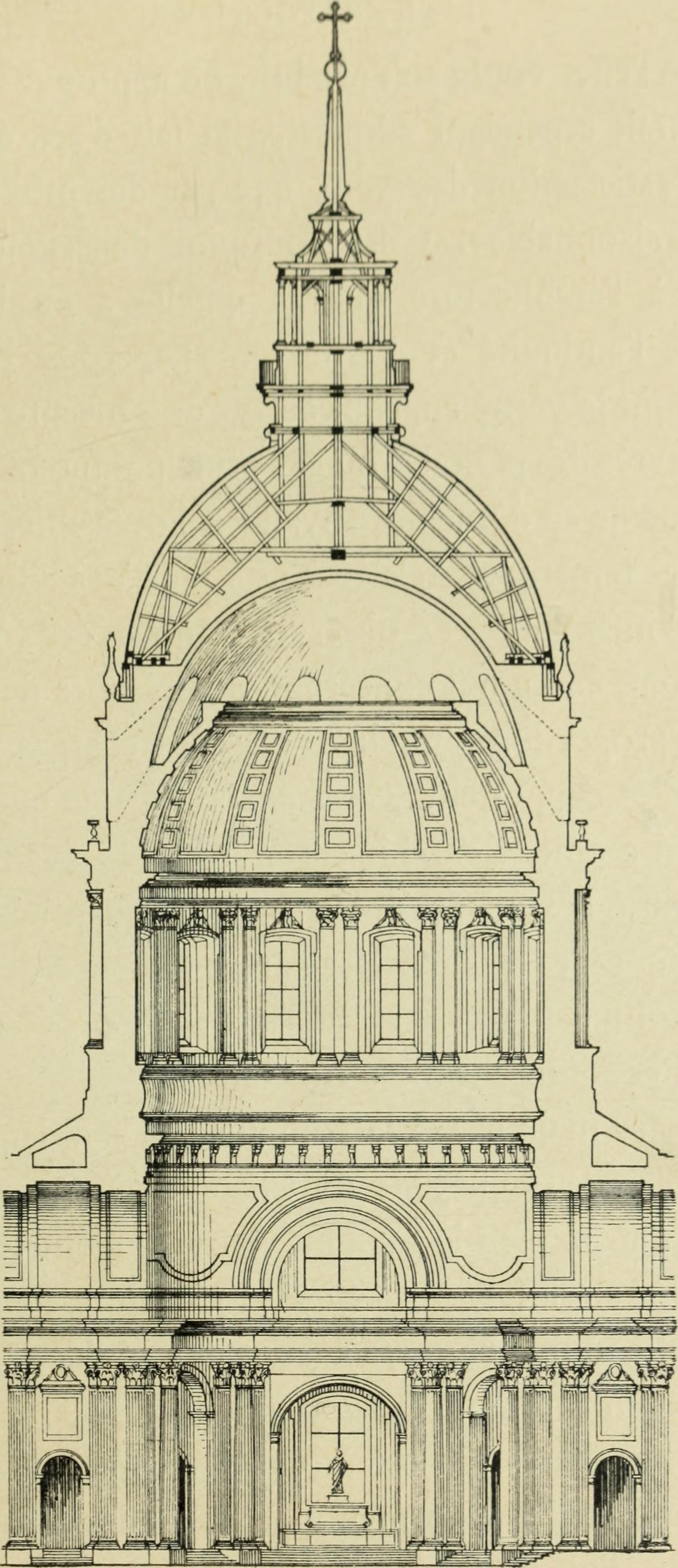
The Dome has a structure of triple hull

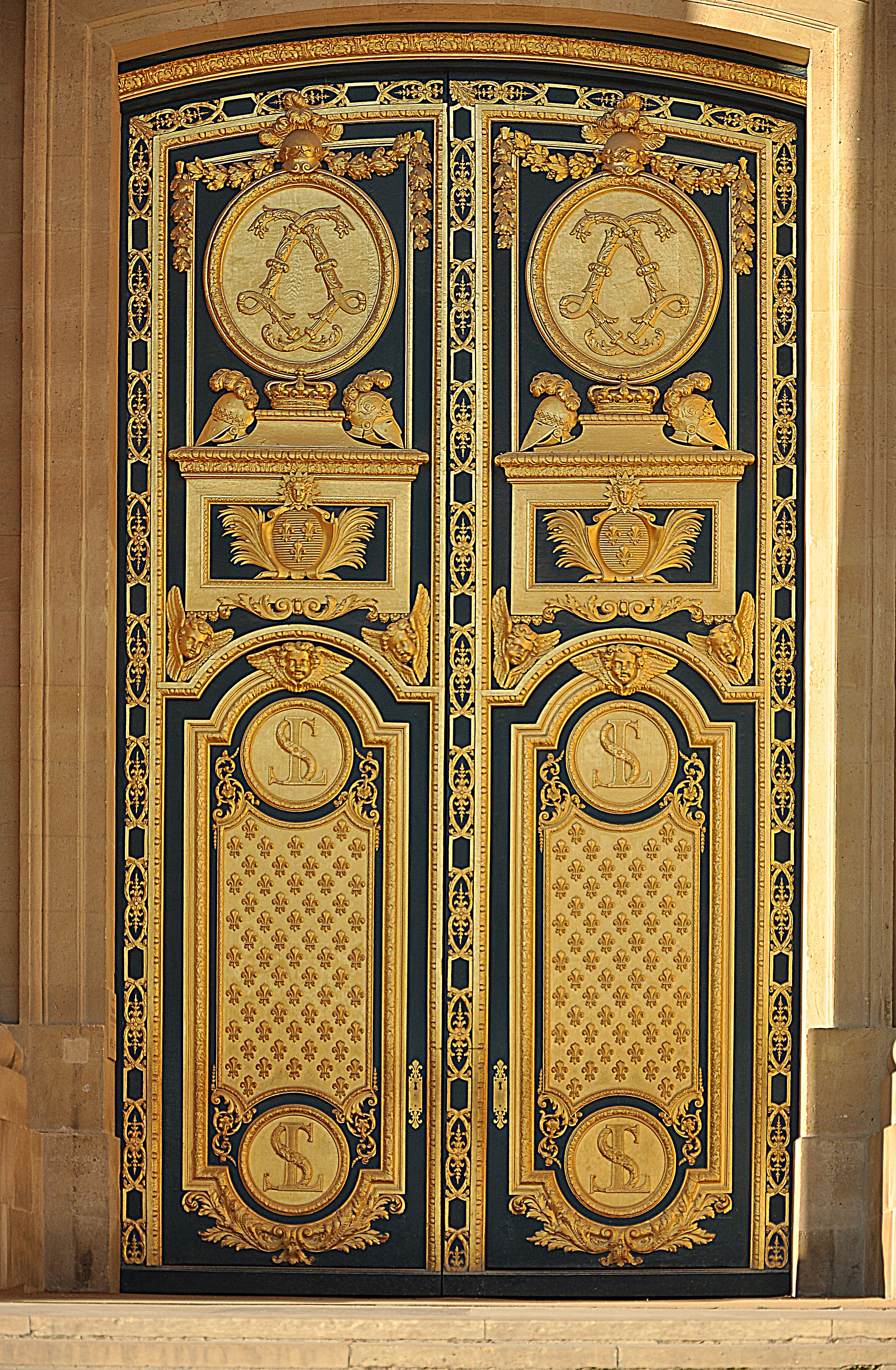
The monumental bronze door of the Dome

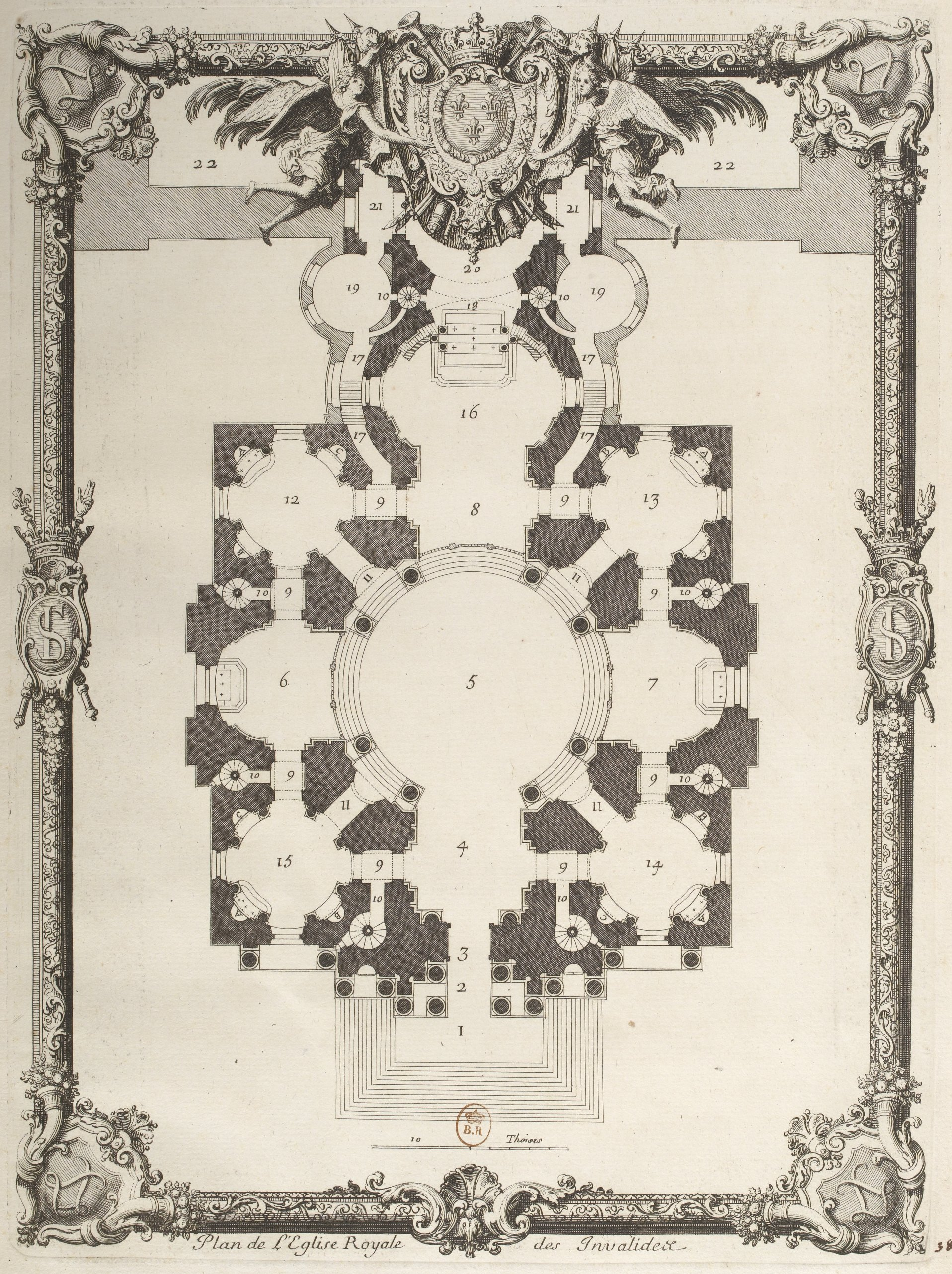
Plan of the Dome

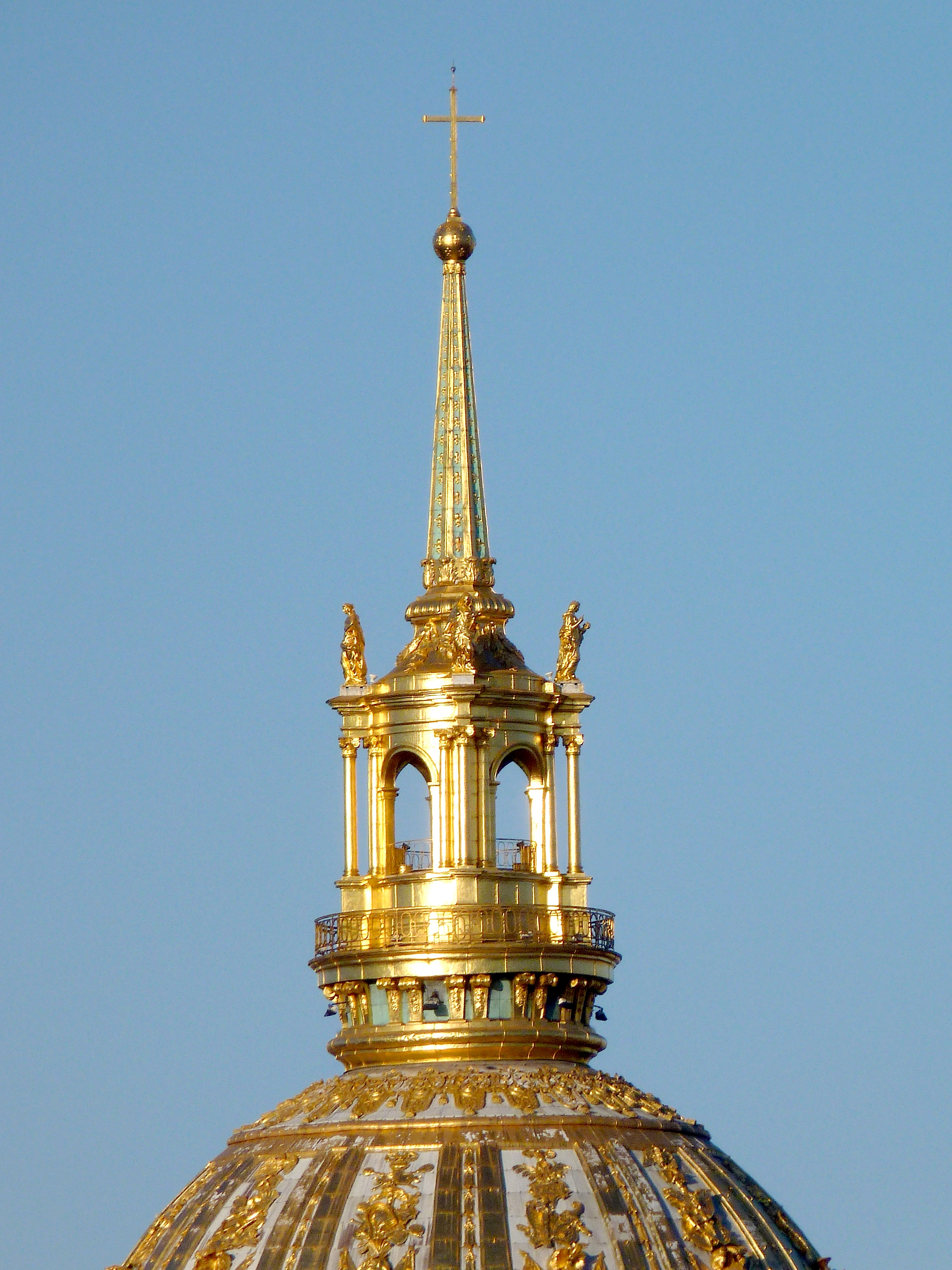
Pinnacle at the top of the Dome

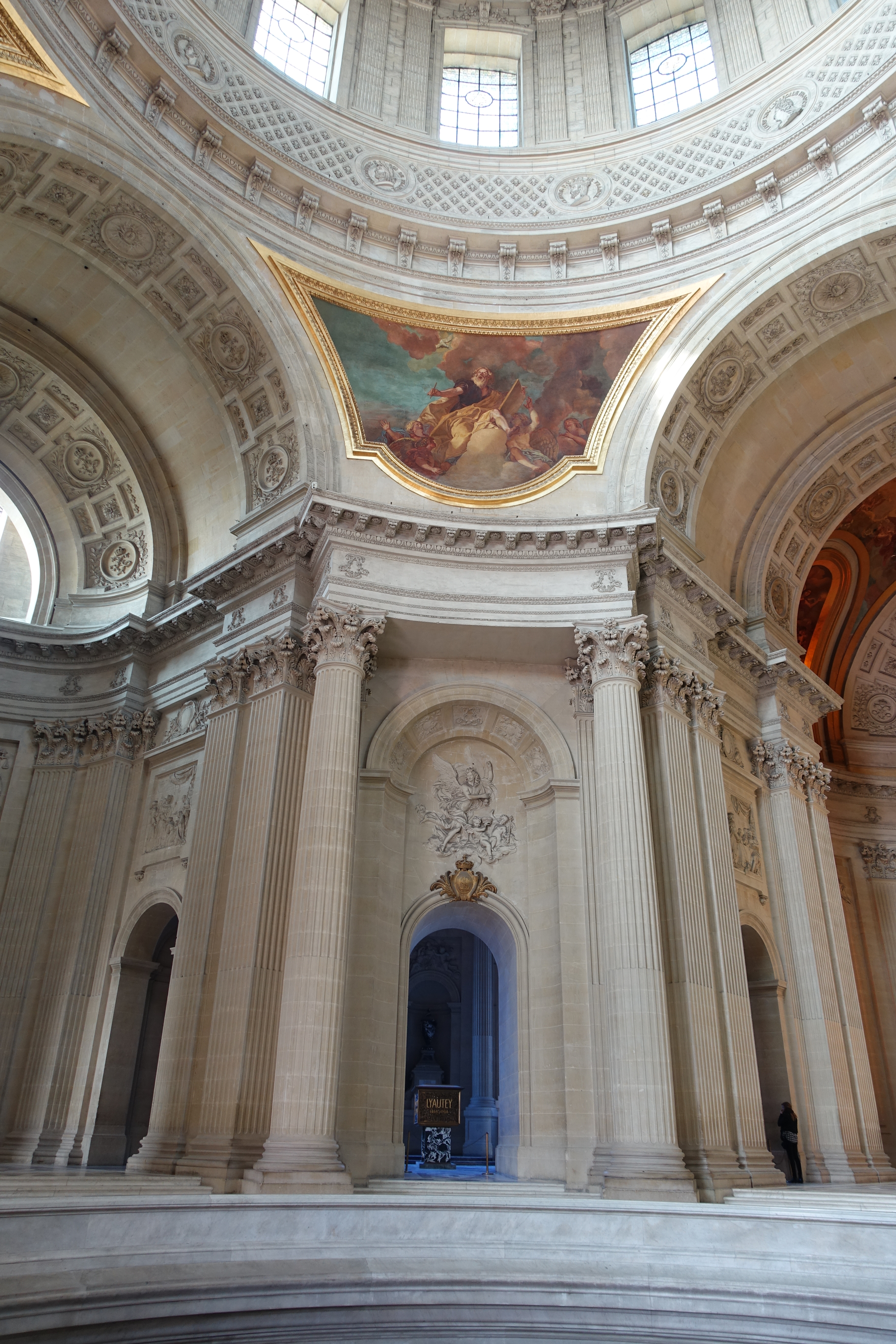
Interior architecture

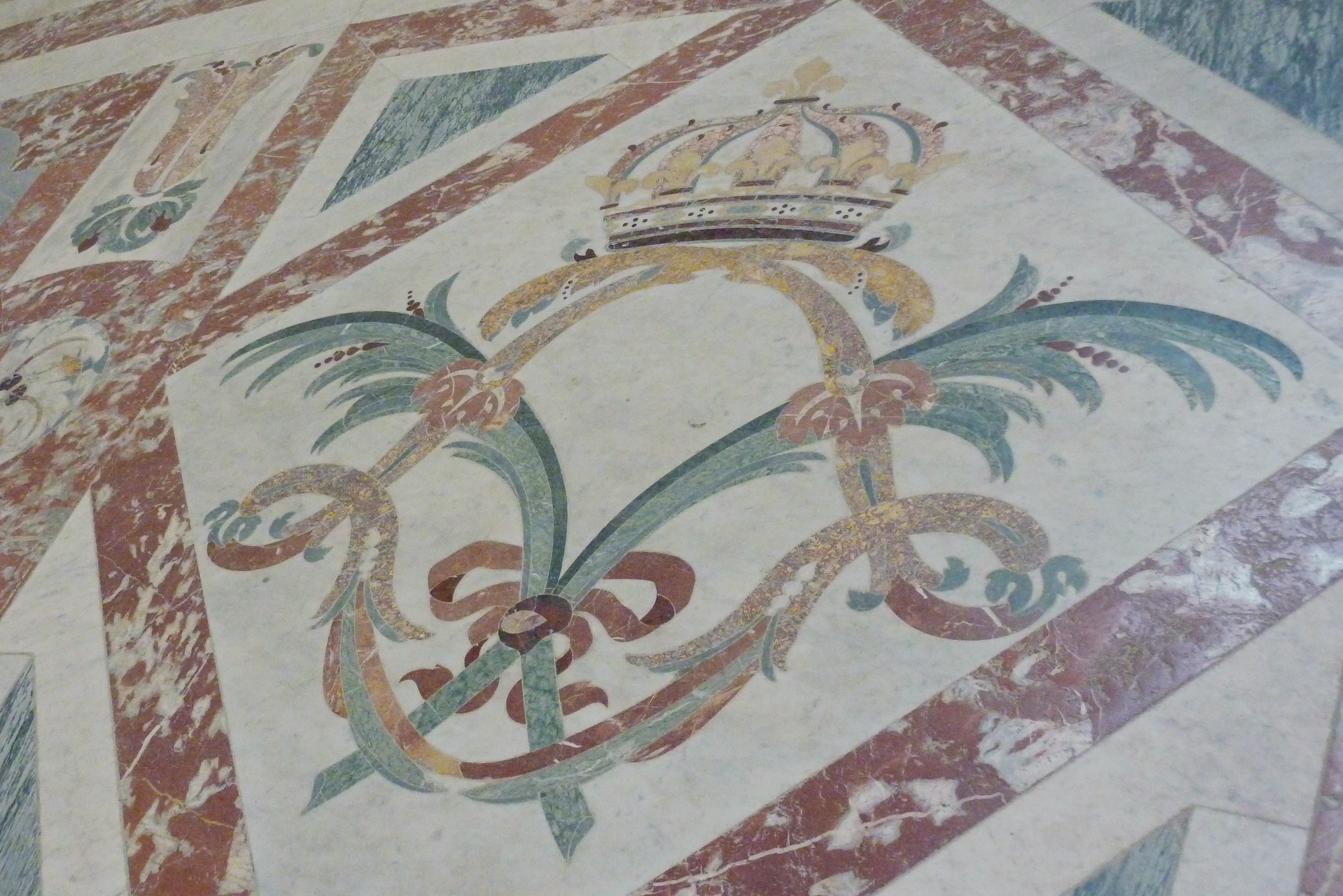
The grounds are covered with polychrome marble marquetries of the 17th century

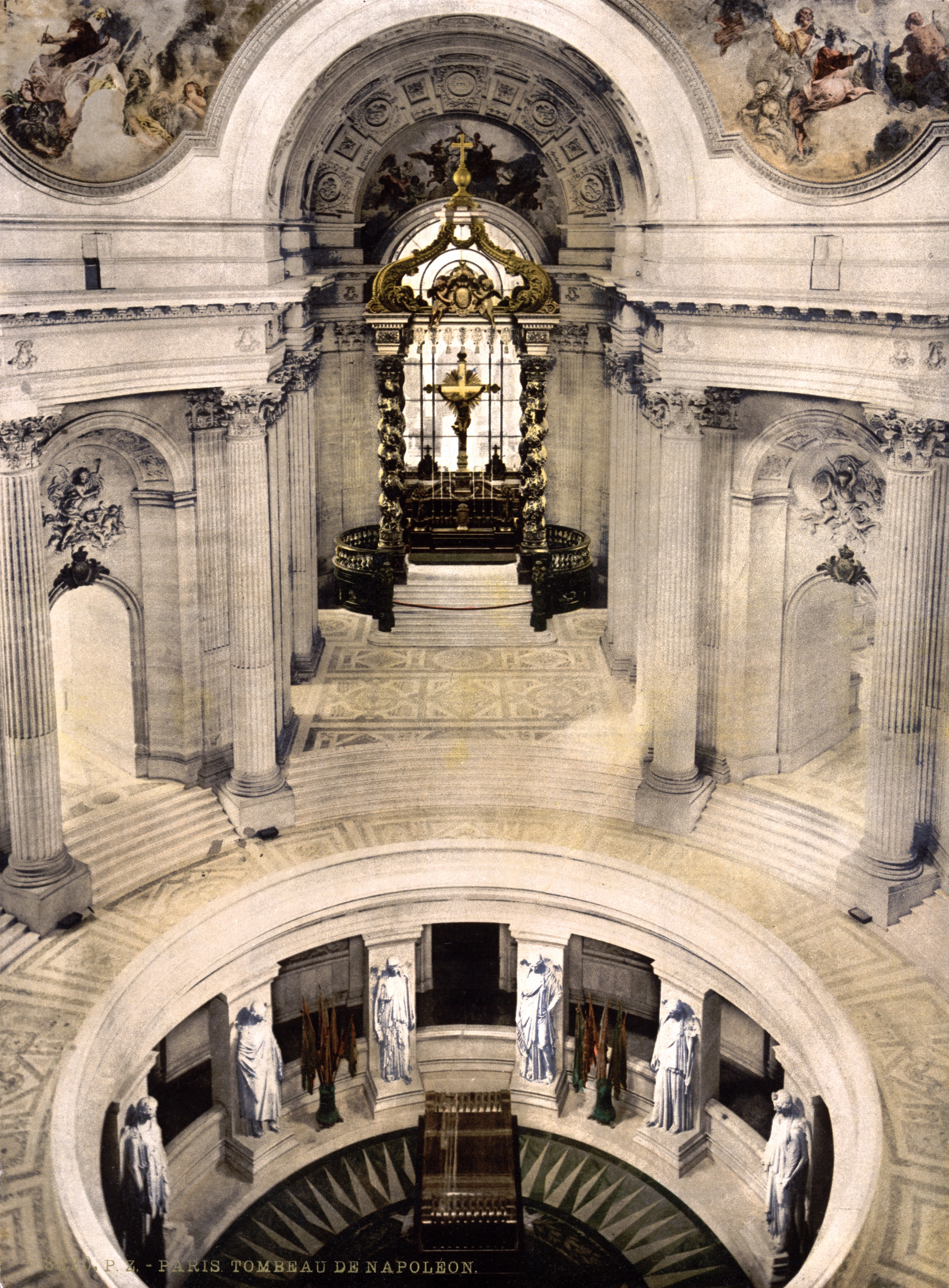
Napoleon's tomb was dug in the center of the Dome

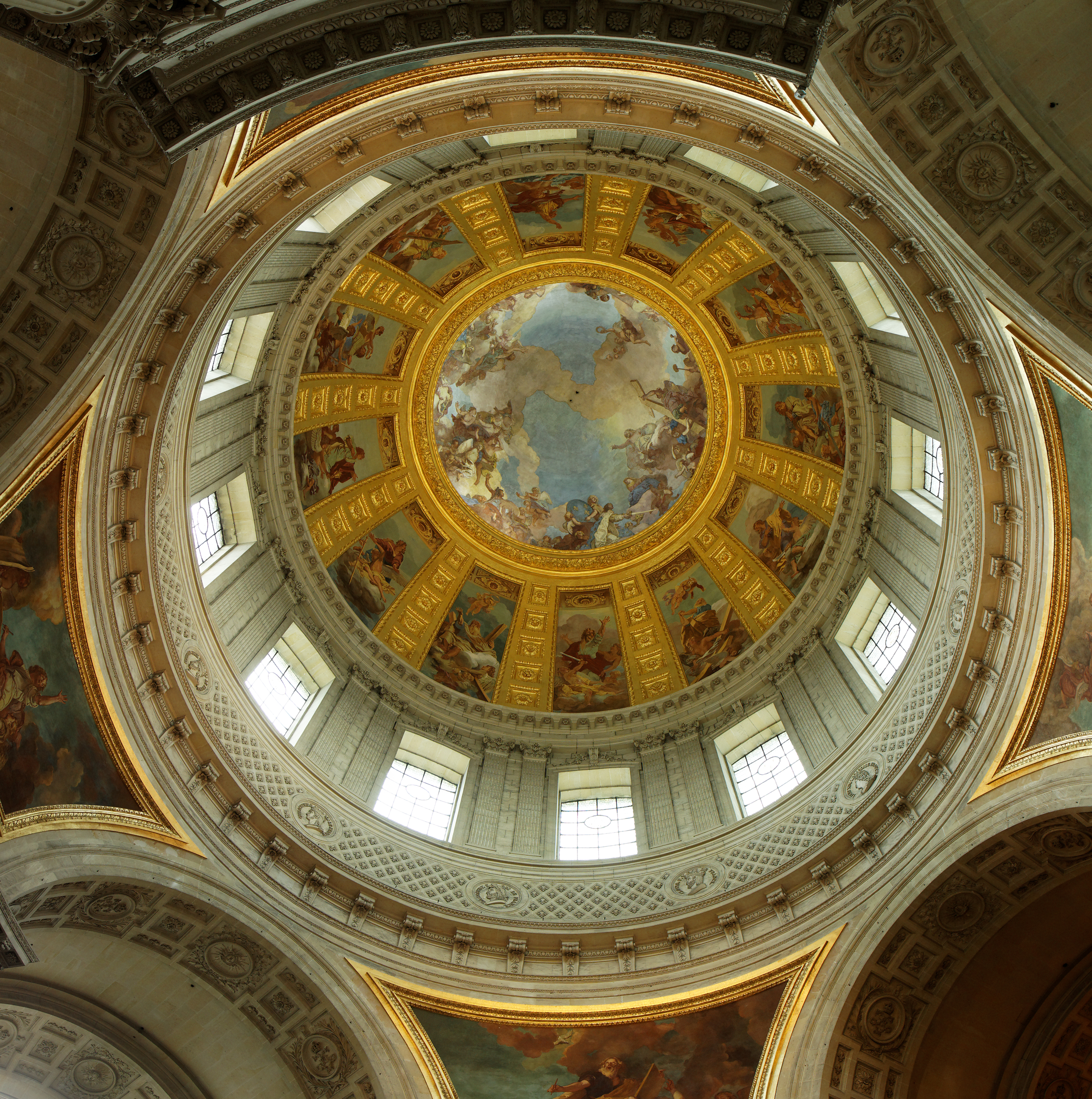
Cupola of the Dome

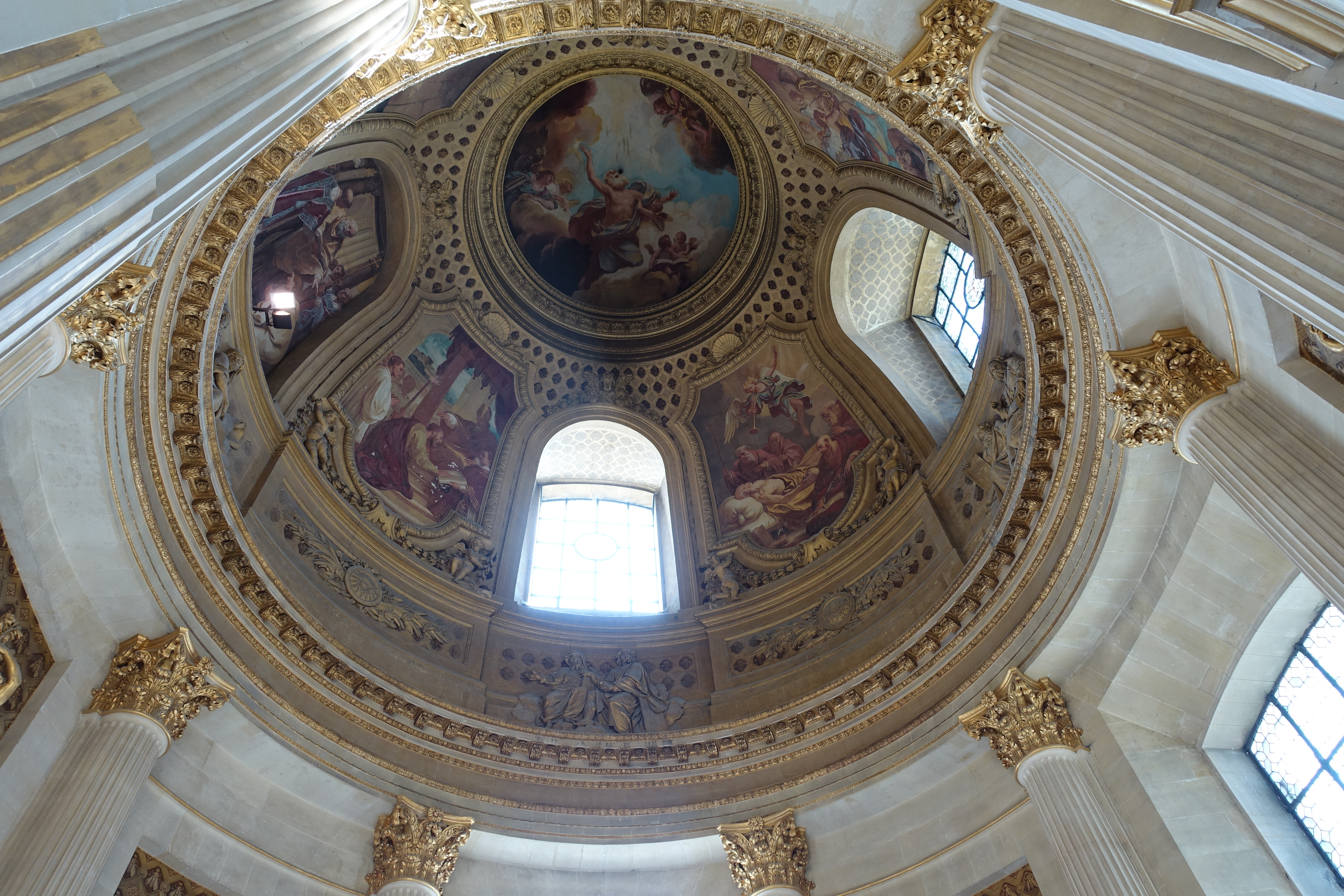
One of the four small side cupolas

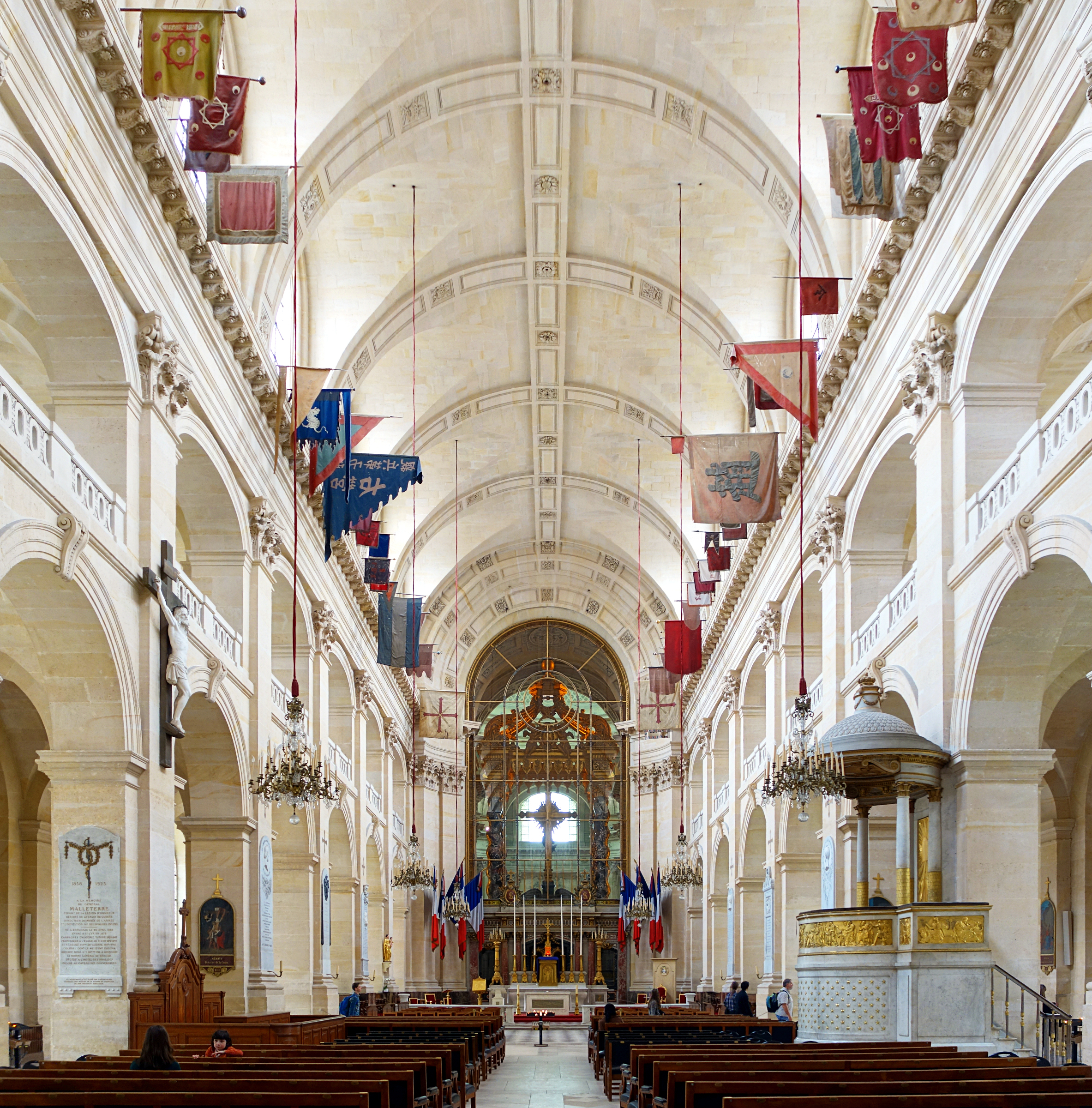
According to an old tradition, war trophies decorate the vault of the Cathédrale Saint-Louis-des-Invalides

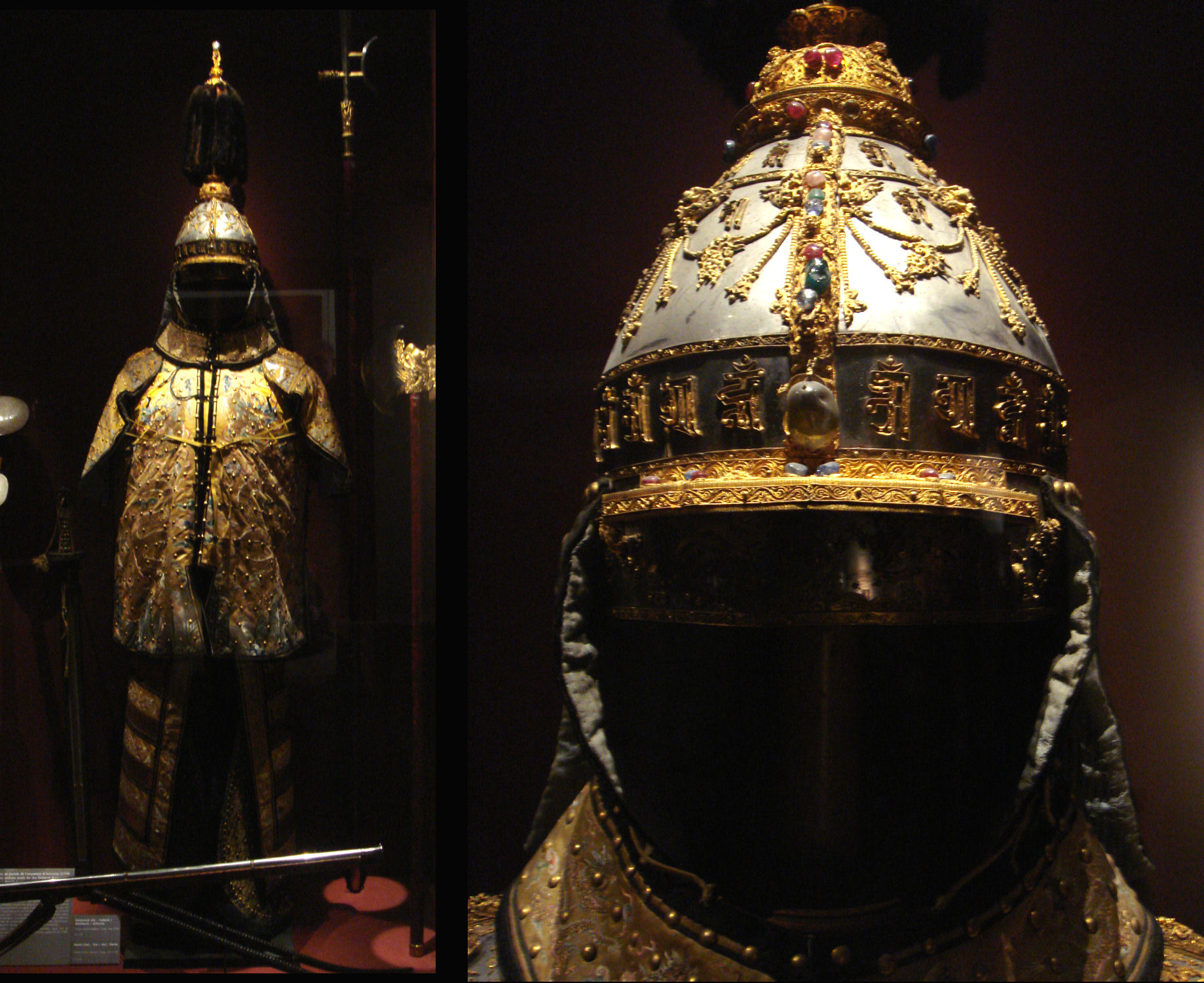
The Qianlong Emperor's military costume at the Musée de l'Armée

== Burials ==
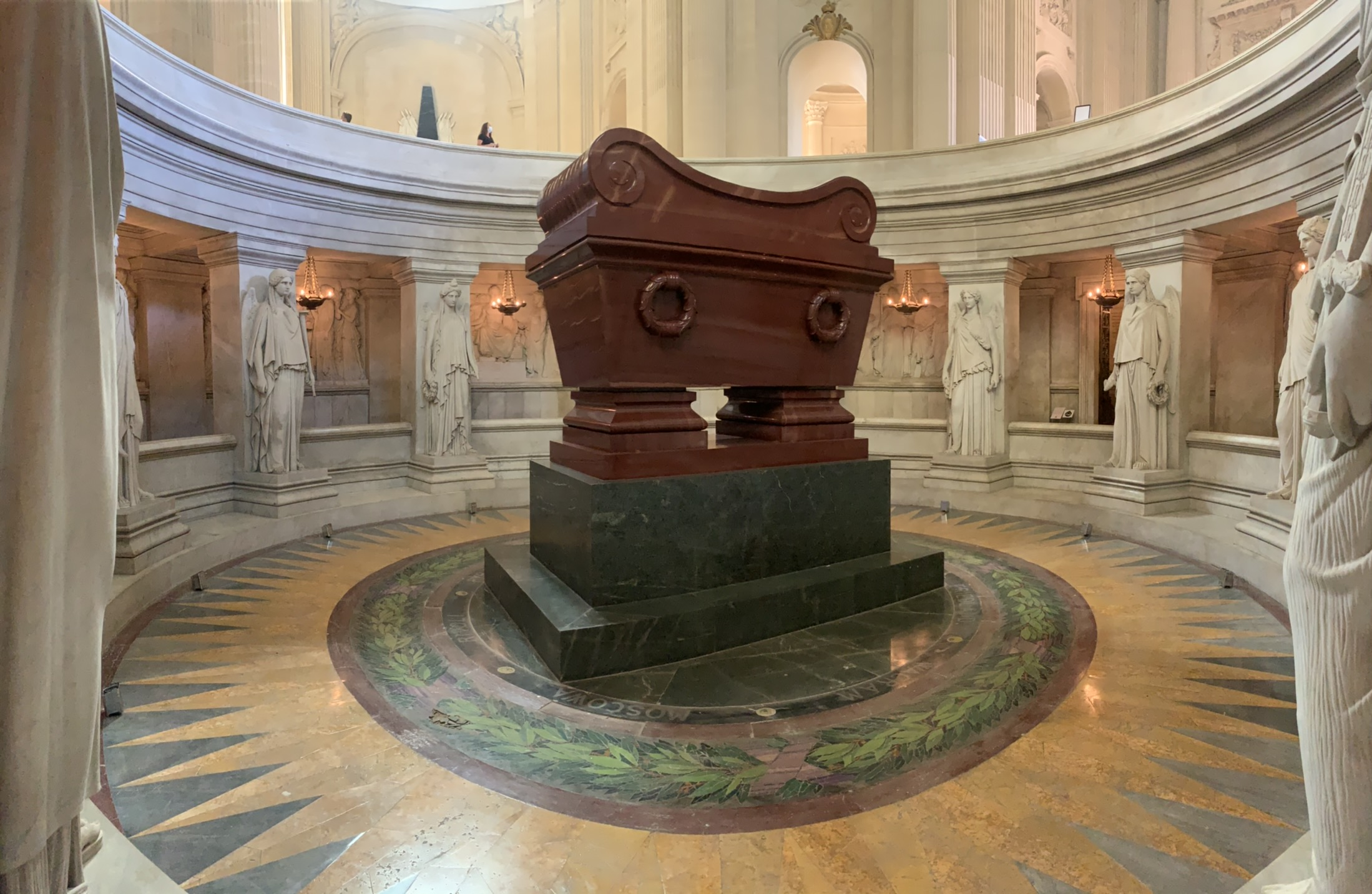
The sarcophagus of Napoleon Bonaparte

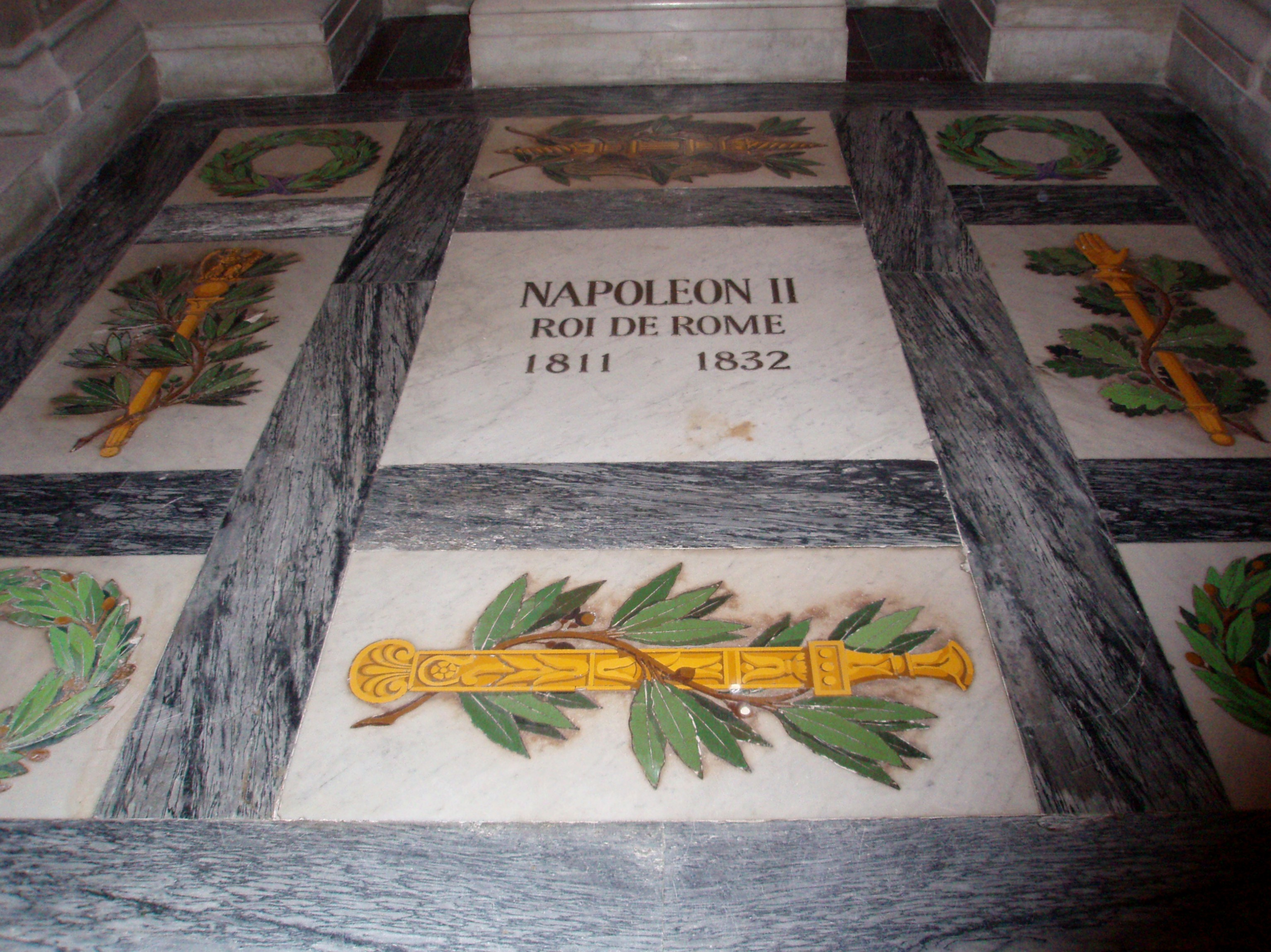
Tomb of Napoleon II at Les Invalides, Paris

The Dome chapel became a military necropolis when Napoleon in September 1800 designated it for the relocation of the tomb of Louis XIV's celebrated general Turenne, followed in 1807–1808 by Vauban. In 1835, the underground gallery below the church received the remains of 14 victims of the Giuseppe Marco Fieschi's failed assassination attempt on Louis-Philippe I. The significant development came with the building's designation to become Napoleon's tomb by a law of 10 June 1840, as part of the political project of the retour des cendres orchestrated by king Louis-Philippe I and his minister Adolphe Thiers (the reference to Napoleon's cendres or "ashes" is actually to his mortal remains, as he had not been cremated). The creation of the crypt and of Napoleon's massive sarcophagus took twenty years to complete and was finished in 1861. By then, it was emperor Napoleon III who was in power and oversaw the ceremony of the transfer of the remains of his uncle from a chapel of the church to the crypt beneath the dome.

=== Inside the Église du Dôme des Invalides ===
The most notable tomb at Les Invalides is that of Napoleon Bonaparte (1769–1821), designed by Louis Visconti with sculptures by James Pradier, Pierre-Charles Simart and Francisque Joseph Duret. Napoleon was initially interred on Saint Helena, but King Louis Philippe arranged for his remains to be brought to France in 1840, an event known as le retour des cendres. Napoleon's remains were kept in the Saint Jerome (southwestern) chapel of the Dome church for more than two decades until his final resting place, a tomb made of red quartzite and resting on a green granite base, was finished in 1861.

Other military figures and members of Napoleon's family were also buried at the Dome church by year of burial there:

- 1800: Henri de La Tour d'Auvergne, Viscount of Turenne (1611–1675); 1670s monument by Gaspard Marsy and Jean-Baptiste Tuby, originally at the Basilica of Saint-Denis and relocated by Napoleon
- 1807–1808: heart of Sébastien Le Prestre de Vauban (1633–1707); relocated by Napoleon from Bazoches, replaced in 1847 with a cenotaph by Antoine Étex
- 1847: Henri Gatien Bertrand (1773–1844), an army general who accompanied Napoleon to Elba and then St Helena, and in 1840 brought Napoleon's body back to France; monument designed by Louis Visconti
- 1847: Géraud Duroc (1772–1813); also by Louis Visconti
- 1862: Jérôme Bonaparte (1784–1860), Napoleon's youngest brother, Governor of the Invalides 1848–1852; monument by Alfred-Nicolas Normand with sculpture by Eugène Guillaume, in the Saint Jerome chapel
- 1864: Joseph Bonaparte (1768–1844), Napoleon's elder brother; monument by Alphonse-Nicolas Crépinet in the Saint Augustine (southeastern) chapel
- Charles Leclerc (1772–1802); urn relocated from the Château de Montgobert
- 1904: heart of Théophile Corret de la Tour d'Auvergne (1743–1800), named by Napoleon the "first grenadier of the Republic"
- 1940: Napoleon II (1811–1832) son of Napoleon (his heart and intestines remained in Vienna); first placed in the church's Saint Jerome Chapel, then buried in the crypt in 1969
- 1858: heart of Catharina of Württemberg (1783–1835), wife of Jérôme Bonaparte, and their son Jérôme Napoléon Charles Bonaparte, in the underground gallery; the monument of Catharina's heart was relocated in 1862 in the Saint Jerome Chapel
- 1937: Ferdinand Foch (1851–1929), monument by Paul Landowski in the Saint Ambrose (northeastern) chapel
- 1963: Hubert Lyautey (1854–1934), relocated from Morocco, monument by Albert Laprade in the Saint Gregory (northwestern) chapel
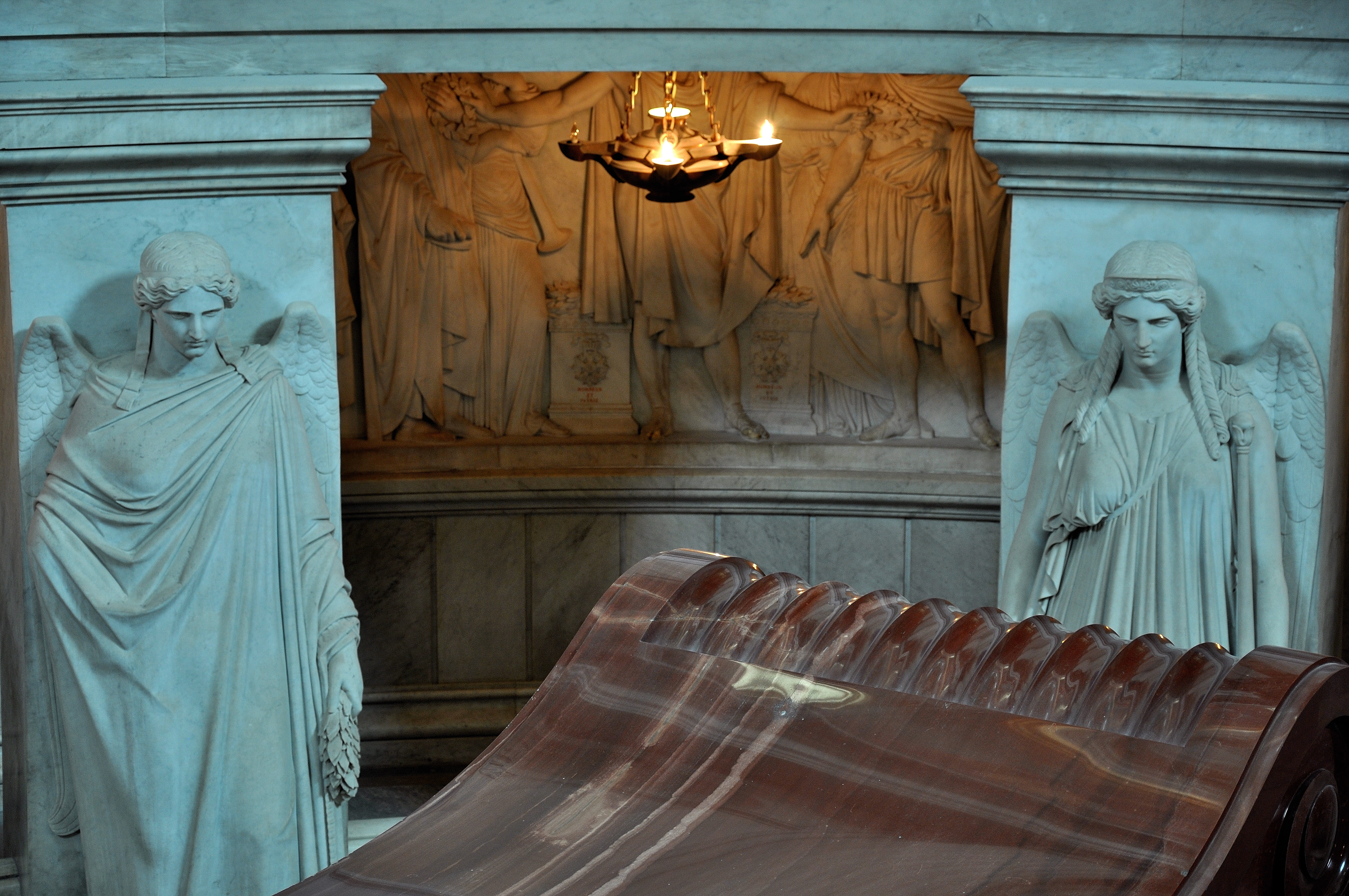
Two of the twelve marble Victories surrounding Napoleon's tomb

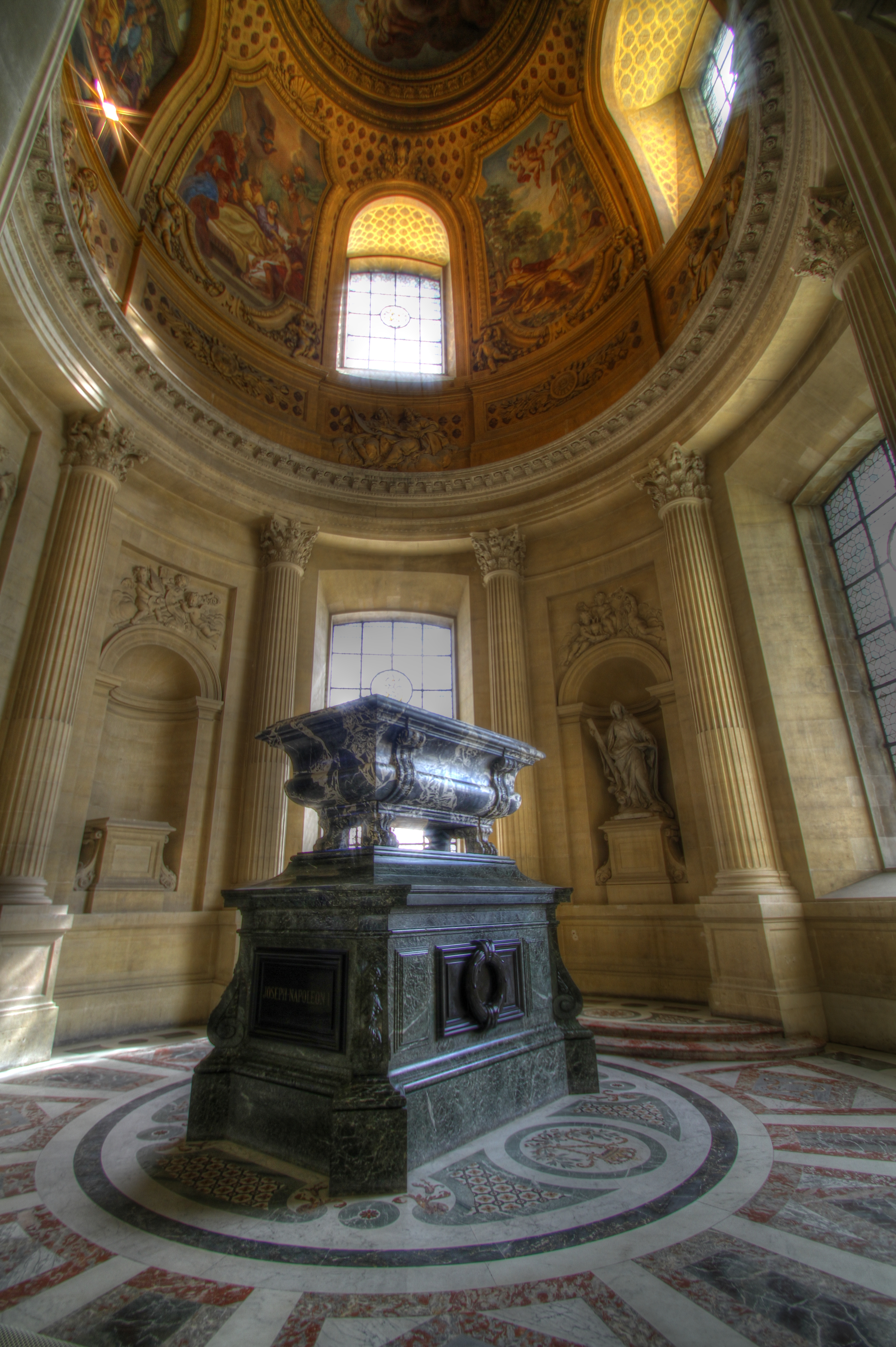
Tomb of Joseph Bonaparte in the Dome church

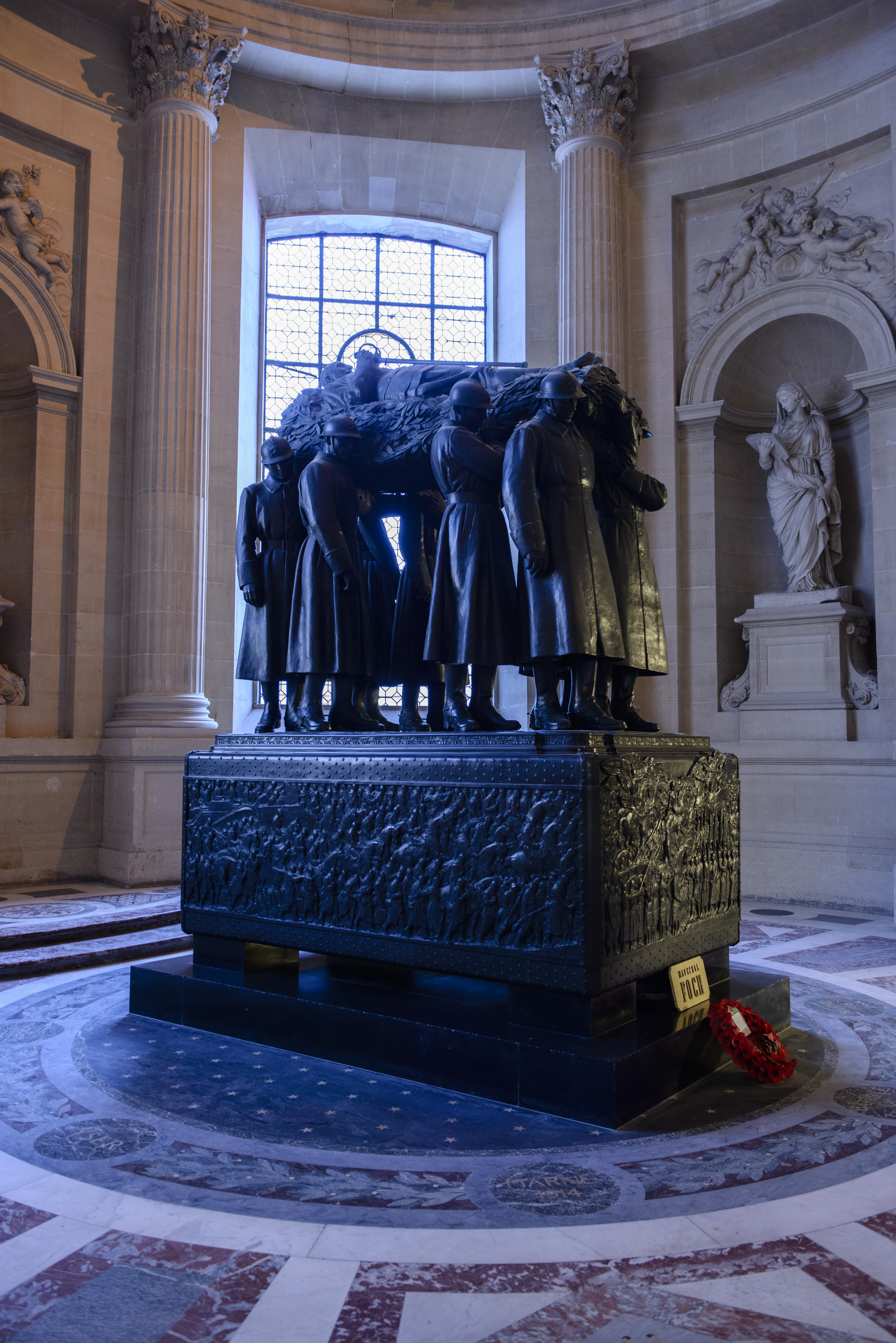
Tomb of Ferdinand Foch in the Dome church

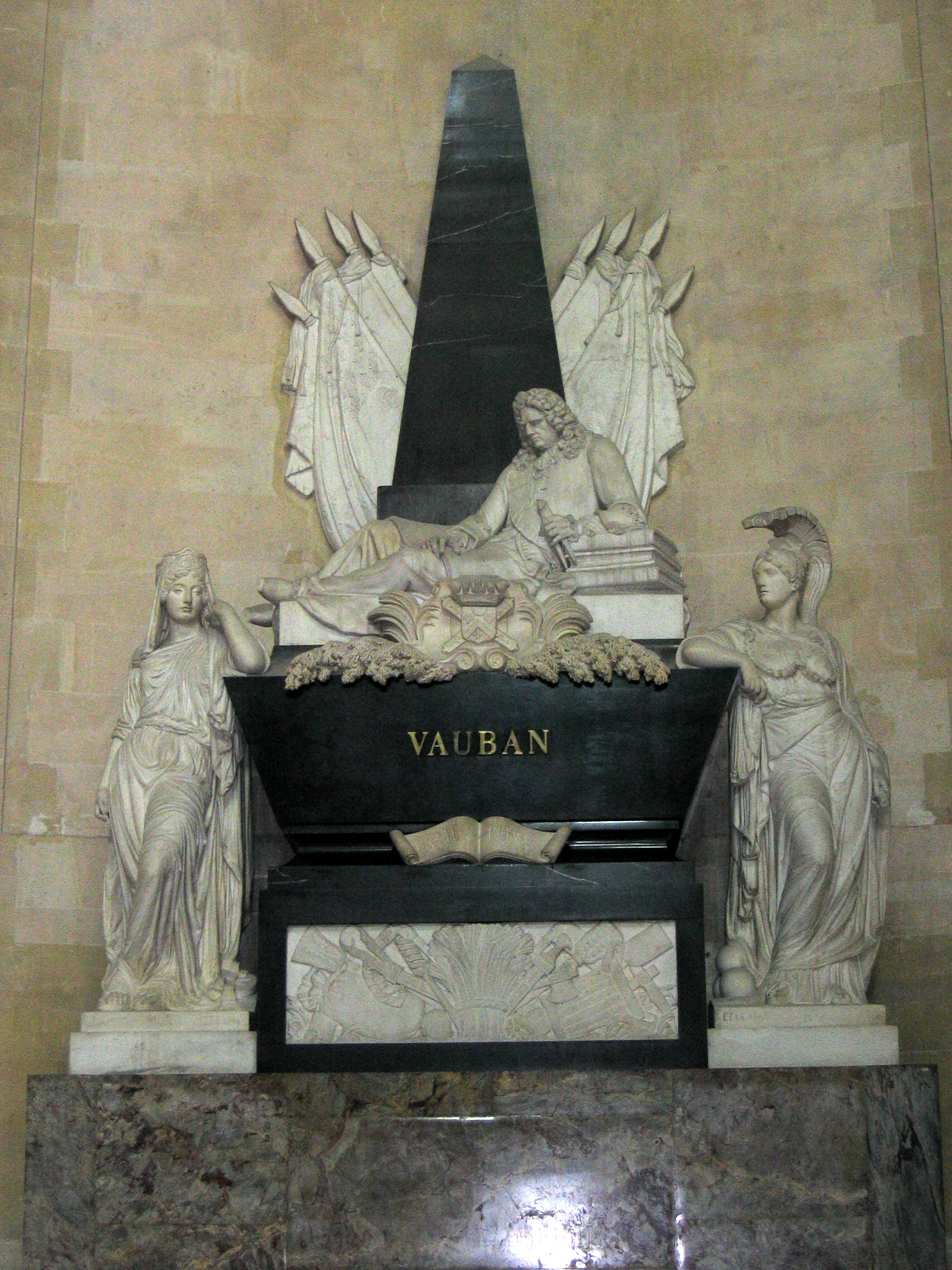
Cenotaph of Vauban in the Dome church

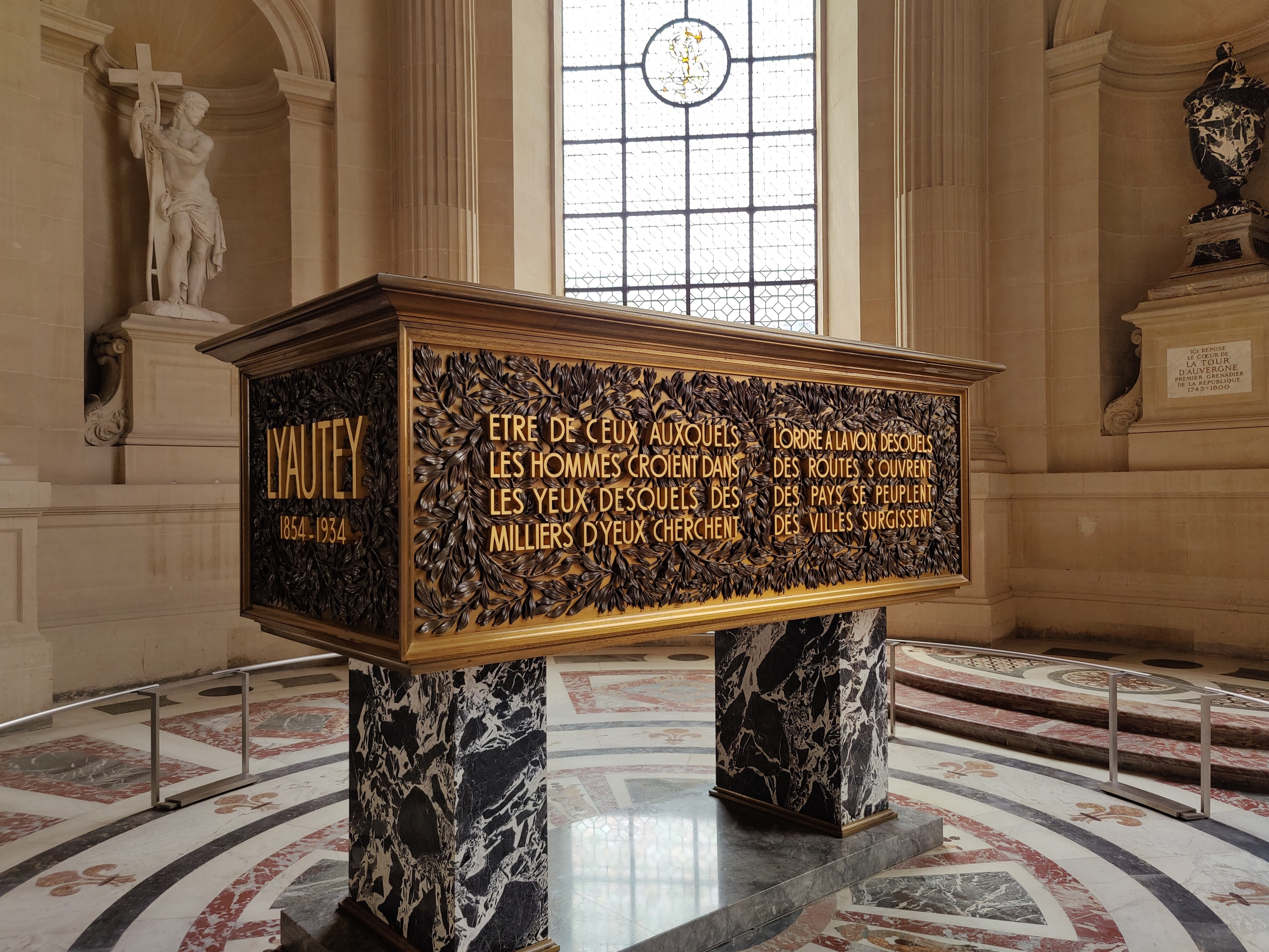
Tomb of marshal Lyautey in the Saint Gregory (northwestern) chapel

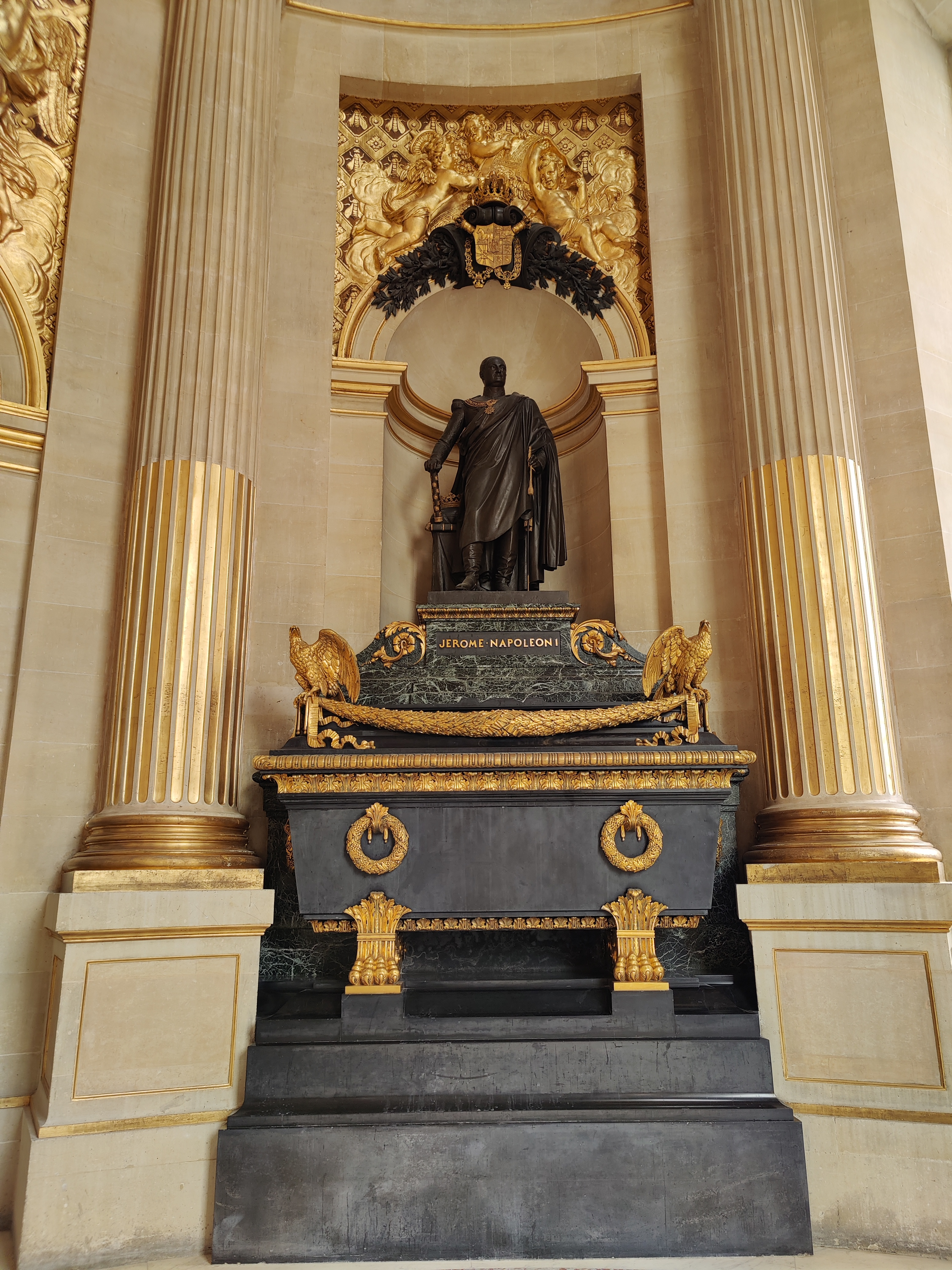
Tomb of Jerome Bonaparte in the Saint Jerome chapel

=== Beneath the Cathédrale Saint-Louis-des-Invalides ===
82 additional military figures, including 28 Governors of Les Invalides, are buried in the Caveau des Gouverneurs, an underground gallery beneath the Cathédrale Saint-Louis-des-Invalides:

- Albert d'Amade (1856–1941)
- Jean-Toussaint Arrighi de Casanova (1778–1853), Governor 1852–1853
- Louis Baraguey d'Hilliers (1764–1813) (heart)
- Achille Baraguey d'Hilliers (1795–1878), Marshal of France
- Jean-François Berruyer (1737?–1804), Governor 1803–1804
- Jean-Baptiste Bessières (1768–1813), Marshal of the Empire
- Baptiste Pierre Bisson (1767–1811) (heart)
- Antoine Baucheron de Boissoudy (1864–1926)
- Thomas Bugeaud (1784–1849), Marshal of France, involved in the conquest of Algeria
- François Canrobert (1809–1895), Marshal of France
- François-Henri de Franquetot de Coigny (1737–1821), Marshal of France, Governor 1816–1821
- Victor Cordonnier (1858–1936)
- Charles-Marie Denys de Damrémont (1783–1837)
- Vincent Martel Deconchy (1768–1823) (heart)
- Denis Auguste Duchêne (1862–1950)
- Guy-Victor Duperré (1775–1846)
- Franciade Fleurus Duvivier (1794–1848)
- Jean Baptiste Eblé (1758–1812) (heart)
- Louis Franchet d'Espèrey (1856–1942), Marshal of France
- Rémy Joseph Isidore Exelmans (1775–1852), Marshal of France
- Émile Fayolle (1852–1928), Marshal of France
- Ernest François Fournier (1842–1934)
- Dominique-Marie Gauchet (1853–1931)
- Augustin Gérard (1857–1926)
- Henri Giraud (1879–1949)
- Émile Guépratte (1856–1939)
- Adolphe Guillaumat (1863–1940)
- Ferdinand-Alphonse Hamelin (1796–1864)
- Jean-Joseph Ange d'Hautpoul (1754–1807) (heart)
- Paul Prosper Henrys (1862–1943)
- Jean Houdemon (1885–1960), Governor 1951–1960
- Georges Louis Humbert (1862–1921)
- Jean-Baptiste Jourdan (1762–1833), Marshal of the Empire, Governor 1830–1833
- Alphonse Juin (1888–1967), Marshal of France
- Jean-Baptiste Kléber (1753–1800) (heart)
- Fernand de Langle de Cary (1849–1927)
- Charles Lanrezac (1852–1925)
- Augustin Boué de Lapeyrère (1852–1924)
- Jean Ambroise Baston de Lariboisière (1759–1812)
- Dominique Jean Larrey (1766–1842), celebrated military surgeon
- Antoine Charles Louis de Lasalle (1777–1809), the "Hussar General"
- Philippe Leclerc de Hauteclocque (1902–1947), Marshal of France
- Patrice de MacMahon (1808–1893), Marshal of France and President of France
- Paul Maistre (1858–1922)
- Gabriel Malleterre (1858–1923), Governor 1919–1923
- Charles Mangin (1866–1925)
- Augustin Eugène Mariaux (1864–1944), Governor 1923–1944
- Edmond-Charles de Martimprey (1808–1883), Governor 1870–1871
- Louis de Maud'huy (1857–1921)
- Michel-Joseph Maunoury (1847–1923), posthumous Marshal of France
- Antoine de Mitry (1857–1924)
- Gabriel Jean Joseph Molitor (1770–1849), Marshal of France, Governor 1847–1848
- Bon-Adrien Jeannot de Moncey (1754–1842), Marshal of the Empire, Governor 1833–1842
- Raoul Magrin-Vernerey a.k.a. Ralph Monclar (1892–1964), Governor 1862–1864
- Georges Mouton (1770–1838), Marshal of France
- François-Marie-Casimir Négrier (1788–1848) (heart)
- Robert Nivelle (1856–1924)
- Nicolas d'Orange des Roches (1618–1705), Governor 1696–1705
- Philippe Antoine d'Ornano (1784–1863), Marshal of France, Governor 1853–1863
- Nicolas Oudinot (1767–1847), Marshal of the Empire, Governor 1842–1847
- Paul Pau (1848–1932)
- Aimable Pélissier (1794–1864), Marshal of France
- Henri Putz (1859–1925)
- Antoine Rodes (1870–1951), Governor 1944–1951
- Pierre Alexis Ronarc'h (1865–1940)
- Pierre Roques (1856–1920), creator of the French Air Force
- Claude Joseph Rouget de Lisle (1760–1836), army captain, author of France's national anthem La Marseillaise
- Pierre Ruffey (1851–1928)
- Auguste Regnaud de Saint-Jean d'Angély (1794–1870), Marshal of France
- Jacques Leroy de Saint-Arnaud (1798–1854), Marshal of France
- Maurice Sarrail (1856–1929) (heart)
- Horace François Bastien Sébastiani de La Porta (1771–1851), Marshal of France
- Jean-Mathieu-Philibert Sérurier (1742–1819), Marshal of France, Governor 1804–1815
- Victor d'Urbal (1858–1943)
- Sylvain Charles Valée (1773–1846), Marshal of France

Two of these, Gabriel Malleterre and Philippe Leclerc de Hauteclocque, are also honored with a plaque inside the Saint-Louis-des-Invalides cathedral. Another plaque honors Jean de Lattre de Tassigny (1889–1952), posthumous Marshal of France, commander of the French First Army during World War II and later commander in the First Indochina War, who is buried in Mouilleron-en-Pareds.

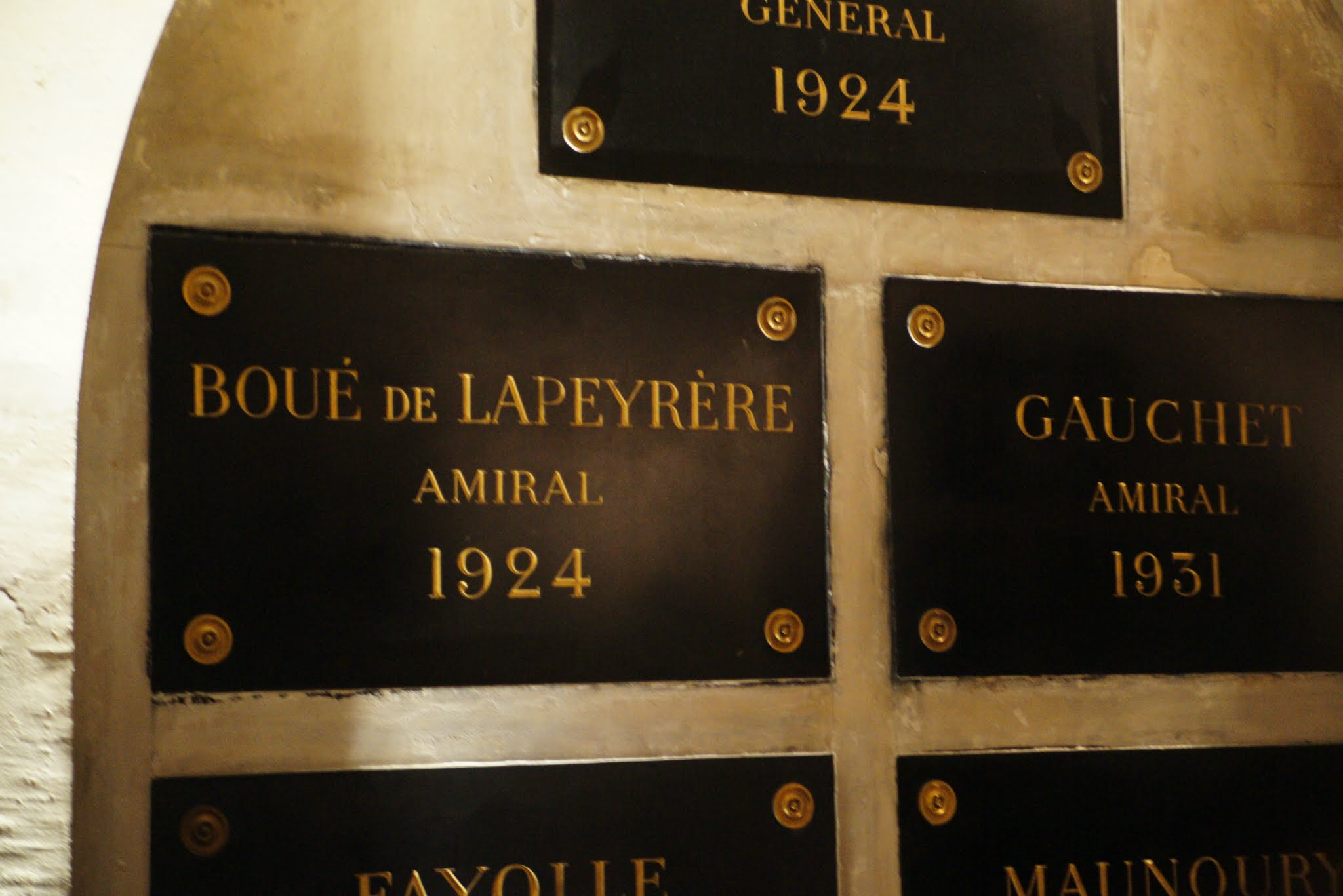
Burial vaults in the Caveau des Gouverneurs beaneath Cathédrale Saint-Louis-des-Invalides

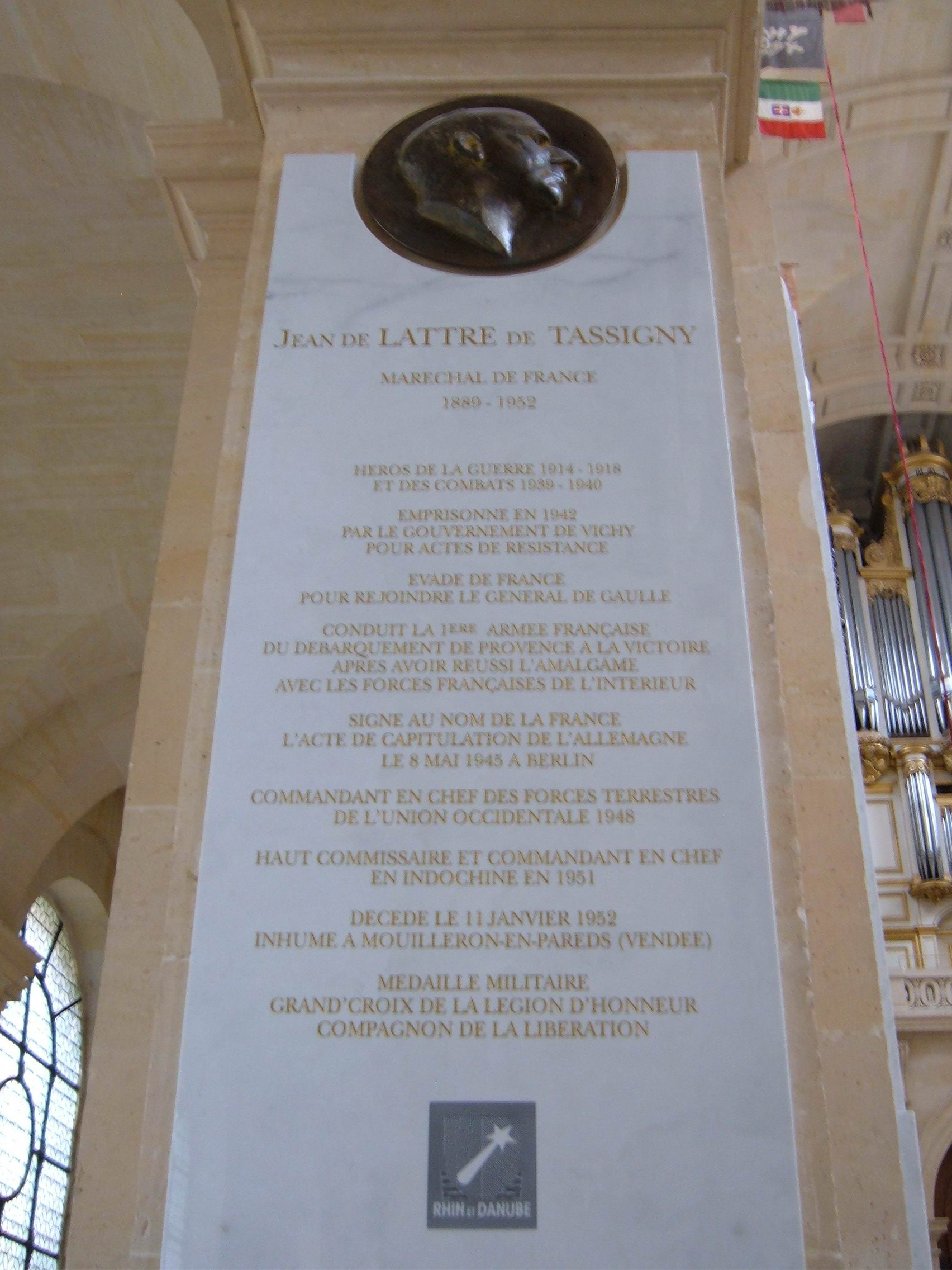
Plaque honoring Marshal de Lattre de Tassigny in Cathédrale Saint-Louis-des-Invalides

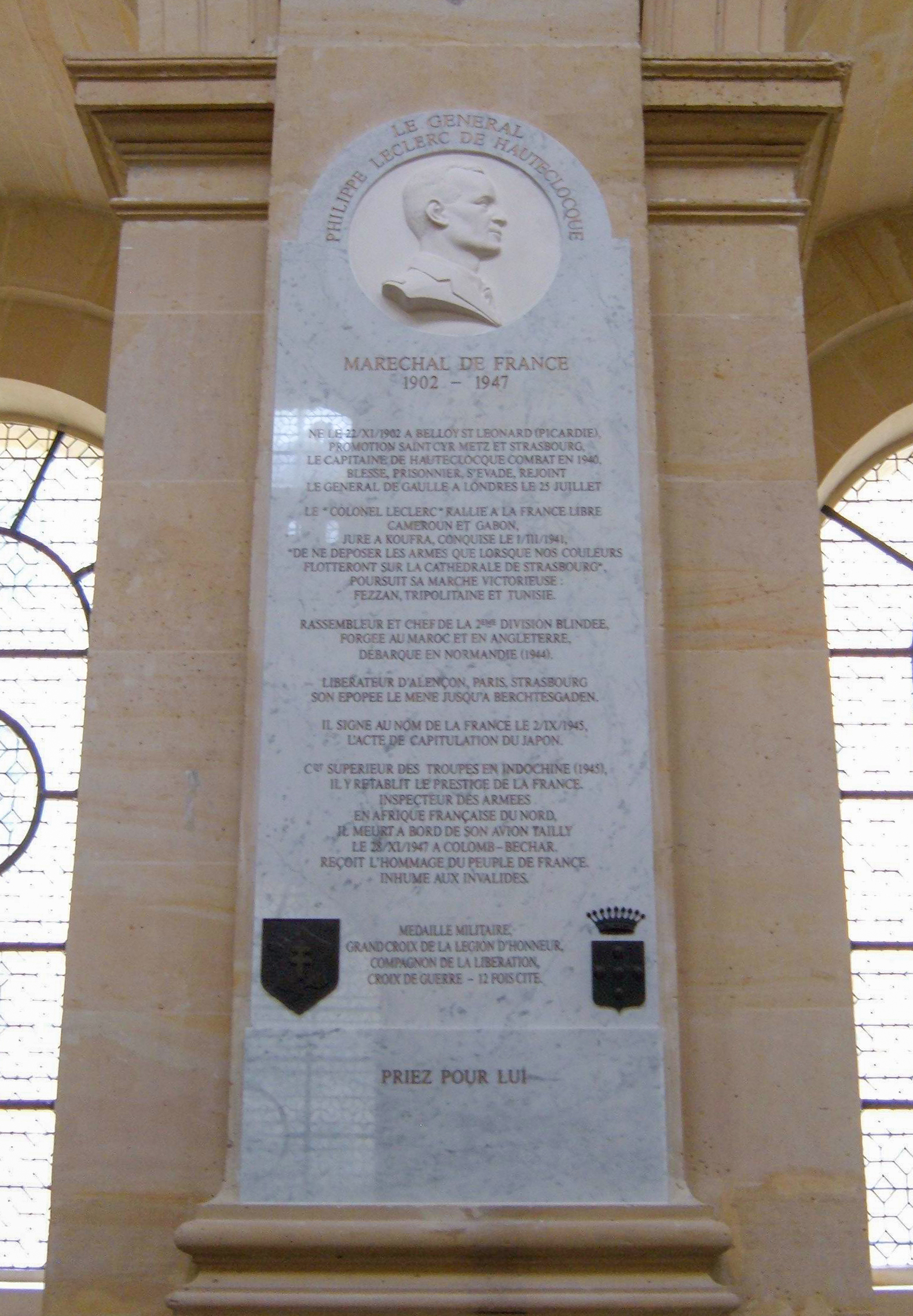
Plaque honoring Marshal Leclerc in Cathédrale Saint-Louis-des-Invalides

== See also ==
- List of museums in Paris
- List of hospitals in France
- List of tallest structures in Paris
- List of tourist attractions in Paris
- List of tallest domes
- Military history of France
- San Francisco City Hall, the design of which was influenced by Les Invalides
- La Tour-Maubourg, adjacent Paris Metro stop convenient to Les Invalides
- National Pantheon of Venezuela
- Buenos Aires Metropolitan Cathedral
- National Pantheon of the Heroes
- Altar de la Patria
- Artigas Mausoleum
- List of works by James Pradier
- 18th-century Western domes
