= Françoise Bernard =

French food writer and television presenter (1921–2021)

Andrée Jonquoy
- Born: 2 March 1921
- Died: 19 September 2021 (aged 100)
- Occupations: food writer and television presenter

Andrée Jonquoy known under the pseudonym Françoise Bernard, (2 March 1921 – 19 September 2021) was a French food writer and television presenter.

== Life and career ==
Bernard was born on 2 March 1921 in Paris, the daughter of a dyer. She began working as a typist at the age of 17, after the war, and was employed by Unilever in 1946.

One day, the company's communication department asked her to play the role of a culinary consultant. The character Françoise Bernard was invented in 1953 by concatenation of the two most common first names of the 1950s, for public speaking and radio. Françoise extols the benefits of Astra margarine (owned by Unilever), using recipes she presents. From 1960 onwards, she also promoted the benefits of the brand's materials Groupe SEB, which earned him the nickname of "Madame Cocotte-minute". She received more than a thousand letters a month from her listeners. She then worked on RTL. In 1963, she wrote a recipe book that competed with Ginette Mathiot's. In these Trente Glorieuses, she symbolizes the modern housewife, cooking faster and cheaper.

Her book Les Recettes faciles has sold over 1 million copies.

Françoise Bernard died at 100 on 19 September 2021.

== Publications ==
- Les Recettes faciles, Hachette, 1965 ISBN 2-01-002172-X, reprinted several times
- La Cuisine à l'électricité with 150 recipes by Françoise Bernard, Hachette, 1967
- Le Livre d'Or, Hachette 1985 ISBN 978-2-010-11123-5
- Les recettes faciles de pâtisserie, Hachette, 1982
- La Bonne Cuisine de Catherine Vialard, Françoise Bernard et Alain Ducasse, 2002
- Nouvelles recettes faciles, 2004, 2008
- Menus et recettes pour toute la famille, 2004
- Cuisine express, 2007
- Les Basiques, Hachette pratique, 2007 ISBN 978-2-01-237304-4
- Cuisine : 1000 recettes, Hachette pratique, 2008 ISBN 978-2-0123-7660-1
- Le Meilleur des desserts de Françoise Bernard et Sébastien Gaudard, 2009
- Ma cuisine d'aujourd'hui, 2010

== Publishing ==
- AFP (16 March 2012). "Françoise Bernard, auteur de recettes pour femmes "moyennement délurées"". Le Point..
- Rédaction Le Parisien (6 December 2012). "Médaille d'argent pour Françoise Bernard". Le Parisien..
- Champion, Caroline; Didier, Béatrice; Fouque, Antoinette; Calle-Gruber, Mireille (2013). "Bernard, Françoise (née Andrée Jonquoy) (Paris 1921)". Le dictionnaire universel des créatrices (in French). Éditions des Femmes. p. 502.
