= Le Dictionnaire universel des créatrices =

- Author: Antoinette Fouque, Béatrice Didier, Mireille Calle-Gruber
- Illustrator: Sonia Rykiel
- Genre: Reference
- Publisher: Éditions des Femmes
- Publication date: November 2013
- Publication place: Paris, France
- ISBN: 978-2-7210-0631-8
- Website: www.dictionnaire-creatrices.com/en/

Le Dictionnaire universel des créatrices (English: The Universal Dictionary of Creatives) is a French biographical dictionary book devoted to creative women, initiated in 2010 and published in 2013. There are three volumes of 4,900 pages, that were written by 1,600 contributors. More than 10,000 women biographies are included in the book. UNESCO has sponsored the book publication.

In 2015, an e-book digital version was released with some 200+ additional biographies added.

== Bibliography ==
- Fouque, Antoinette; Didier, Beatrice; Calle-Gruber, Mireille (November 2013). Le Dictionnaire universel des créatrices. France: Éditions des Femmes. ISBN 978-2-7210-0631-8.

== See also ==
- Dictionary of Women Worldwide
- Women in World History
