= Laying of flowers for the wife of the Unknown Soldier =

Public demonstration

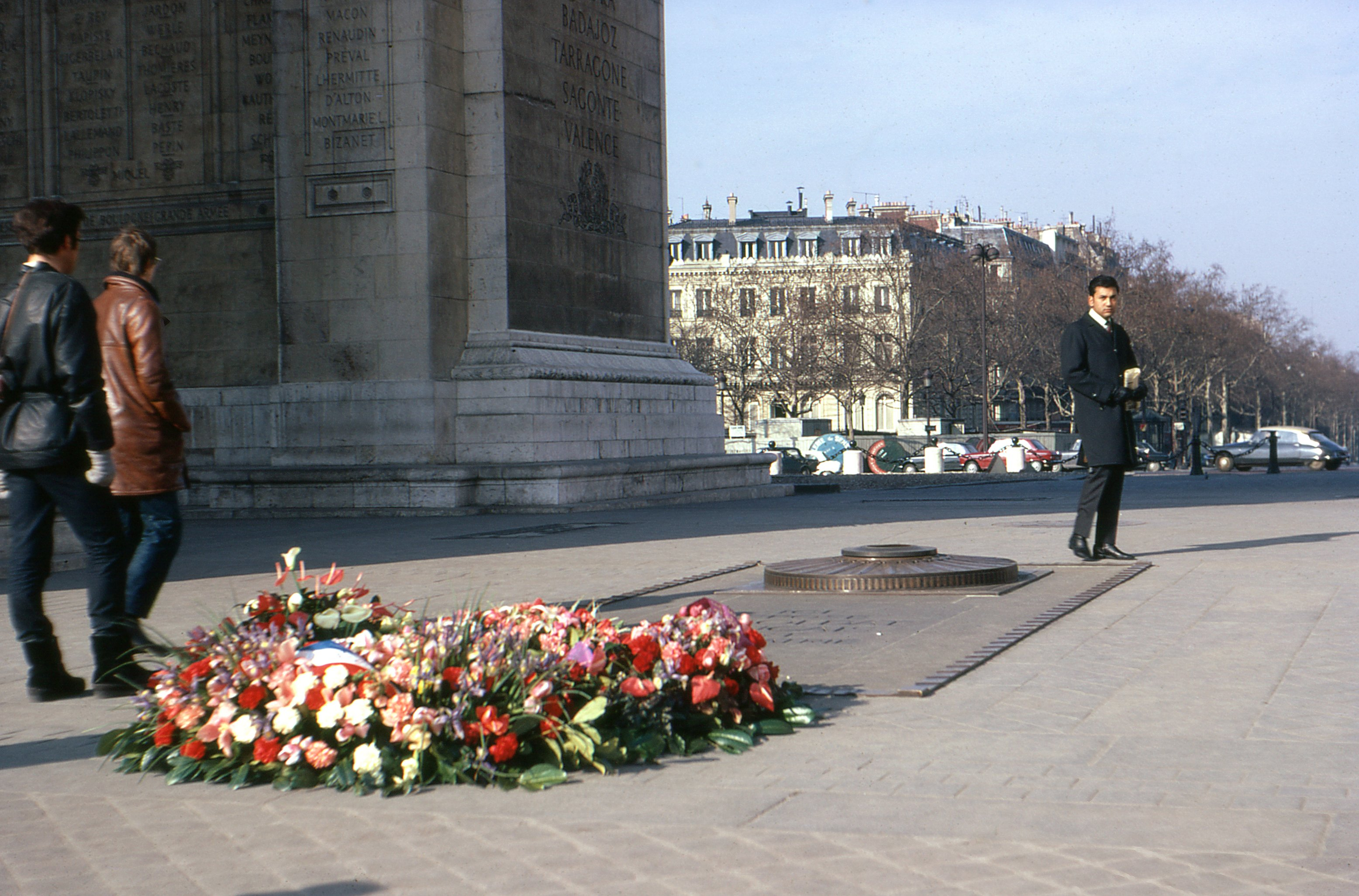
The tomb of the Unknown Soldier in 1970.

The laying of flowers for the wife of the Unknown Soldier was the first public demonstration by the Mouvement de libération des femmes (MLF), taking place on the 26 August 1970 in Paris. The demonstration aimed to place a floral spray on the Tomb of the Unknown Soldier under the Arc de Triomphe, in tribute to "the wife of the Unknown Soldier". This action was carried out by nine women, including Cathy Bernheim, Christine Delphy, and Monique Wittig. However, they were arrested by the police as they made their way towards the Arc de Triomphe and the laying of flowers never took place.

== Background ==
The demonstration was organised in solidarity with the Women's Strike for Equality, which took place on 26 August 1970, on the occasion of the fiftieth anniversary of women's right to vote in the United States.

== Sequence of events ==
The protestors gathered at Place de l'Étoile on 26 August 1970, in the evening according to Le Monde, around noon according to Christine Delphy's account, or around 5:30pm according to Causette. They sported four banners, which read: "One in every two men is a woman", "Solidarity with the women on strike in the USA", and "There is someone even more unknown than the Unknown Soldier, his wife". Christine Delphy carried an enormous spray of flowers, wrapped in a wide purple ribbon that read: "To the wife of the Unknown Soldier, from women who are fighting".

Police officers prevented them from laying the flowers on the tomb and brought them into the left pillar of the Arc de Triomphe, where there was a security post. They were then transferred to a nearby police station, singing songs while held in custody. Christine Delphy later recounted: "They had absolutely no idea what to do with us, they didn't understand. Some of them felt offended by the banner 'One in every two men is a woman', they thought we were calling them homosexuals". After several hours, the women were released.

== Participants ==
Some media outlets reported that there were about thirty women present. But only nine participants are confirmed: Cathy Bernheim, Christine Delphy, Monique Wittig, Anne Zelensky, Janine Sert, Frédérique Daber, Emmanuèle de Lesseps, Christiane Rochefort and Namascar Shaktini (known at the time as Margaret Stephenson).

== Aftermath ==
The demonstration was the first visible action by MLF. It is considered to be the birth of the movement, helping to raise its profile and leading to a surge in membership.

Following this event, the press coined the name Mouvement de libération des femmes, a translation of the American Women's Liberation Movement. The name was then being adopted by the activists.
