= Tomb of the Unknown Soldier (France) =

First World War memorial

- Tombe du Soldat inconnu
- France
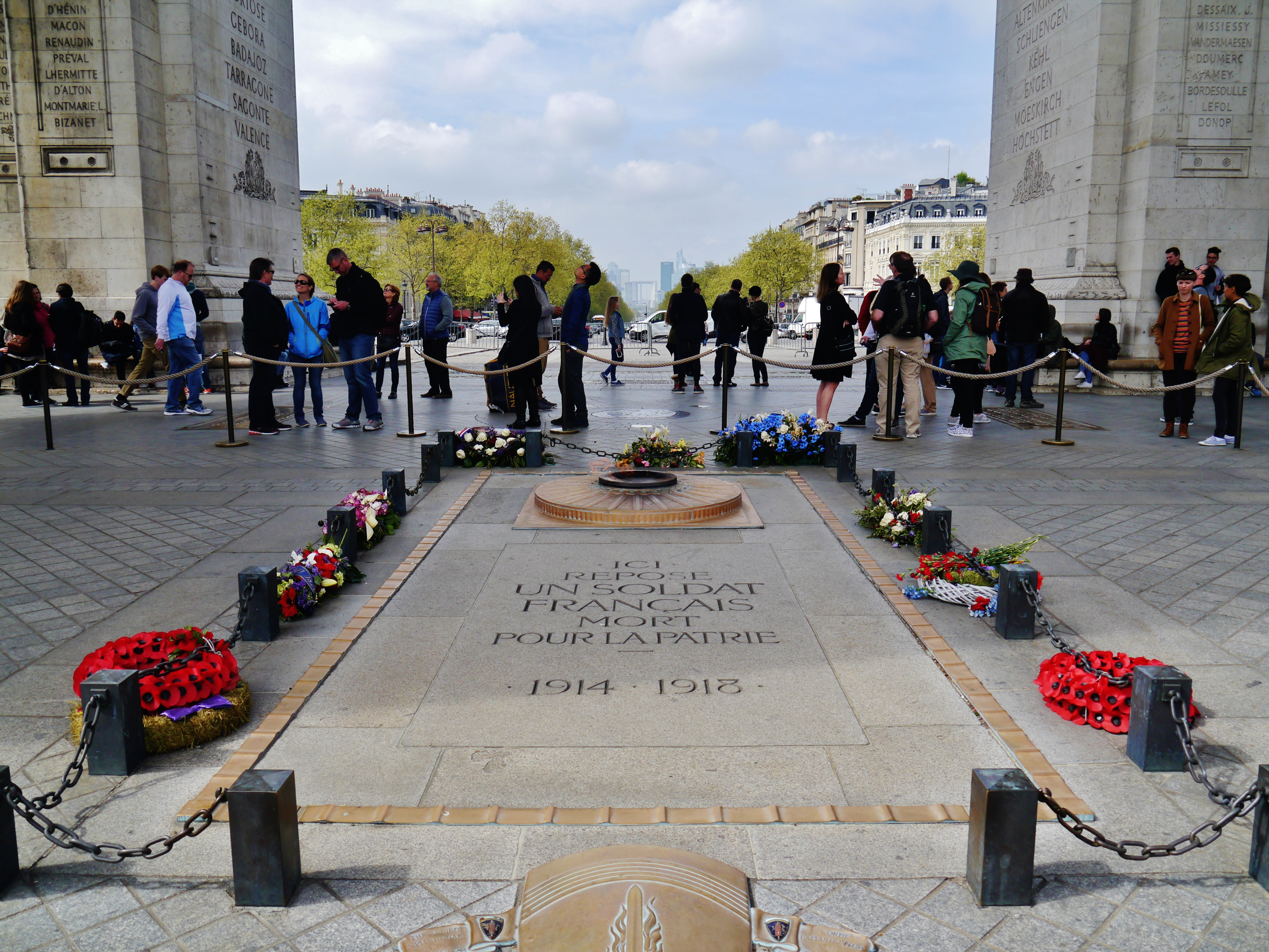
- For the commemoration of all soldiers who have died for France throughout history
- Unveiled: 11 November 1920
- Location: 48°52′25.6″N 2°17′42.1″E; Arc de Triomphe; Place Charles de Gaulle (formerly Place de l'Étoile); Paris, France
- ・ ICI ・ REPOSE; UN SOLDAT; FRANÇAIS; MORT; POUR LA PATRIE — ・ 1914 ・ 1918 ・ (HERE RESTS A FRENCH SOLDIER WHO DIED FOR THE FATHERLAND, 1914–1918)

The Tomb of the Unknown Soldier (French: Tombe du Soldat inconnu) holds an unidentified member of the French armed forces killed during the First World War, to symbolically commemorate all soldiers who have died for France throughout history. It was installed in Paris under the Arc de Triomphe on 11 November 1920, simultaneously with the interment of a British unknown soldier in Westminster Abbey, making both graves the first examples of a tomb of the Unknown Soldier, and the first to honour the unknown dead of the First World War.

The burial site, surrounded by black metal posts linked together by chains, consists of a slab of granite from Vire on which is inscribed the epitaph: Ici repose un soldat français mort pour la Patrie, 1914–1918 ("Here rests a French soldier who died for the Fatherland, 1914–1918"). In 1923, an eternal flame was added, rekindled every day at 6:30 pm. After World War II, a bronze shield embellished with a sword engulfed in flames, offered by the Allies to the glory of the French armies and in memory of the liberation of Paris, was installed at the foot of the tomb. In 2021, the shield was moved to the Salle des Palmes.

The expression Dalle sacrée ("Sacred slab"), popularized by General Weygand, is used by associations of veterans to designate the tomb and its flame. The monument is guarded on a permanent basis by a specialized unit of the National Police.

== Context ==
From the first year of the Great War, many projects to honour the dead were launched. Thus, the number of plaques and visitors' books began to increase. The honorary mention of Mort pour la France ("Died for France") was made into law on 2 July 1915, for those who died in combat.

In a speech at the Rennes Eastern Cemetery on 26 November 1916, François Simon, president of the local section of the Souvenir français (an association founded in 1887 to keep alive the memory of the dead of the Franco-Prussian War of 1870), first evoked the idea of opening the doors of the Panthéon to one of the ignored fighters who died bravely:

Pourquoi la France n'ouvrirait-elle pas les portes du Panthéon à l'un de nos combattants ignorés, mort bravement pour la patrie, avec, pour inscription sur la pierre, deux mots : « un soldat » ; deux dates : « 1914–1917 » ? Cette inhumation d'un simple soldat sous ce dôme, où reposent tant de gloire et de génies, serait comme un symbole ; et plus, ce serait un hommage rendu à l'armée française tout entière.

Why should France not open the doors of the Pantheon to one of our ignored fighters, who died bravely for the country, with two words for inscription on the stone: "a soldier"; and two dates: "1914–1917"? (Note: The speech is dated 26 November 1916.) This burial of a private soldier under this dome, where so much glory and genius rest, would be like a symbol; and more, it would be a tribute to the entire French army.

— François Simon

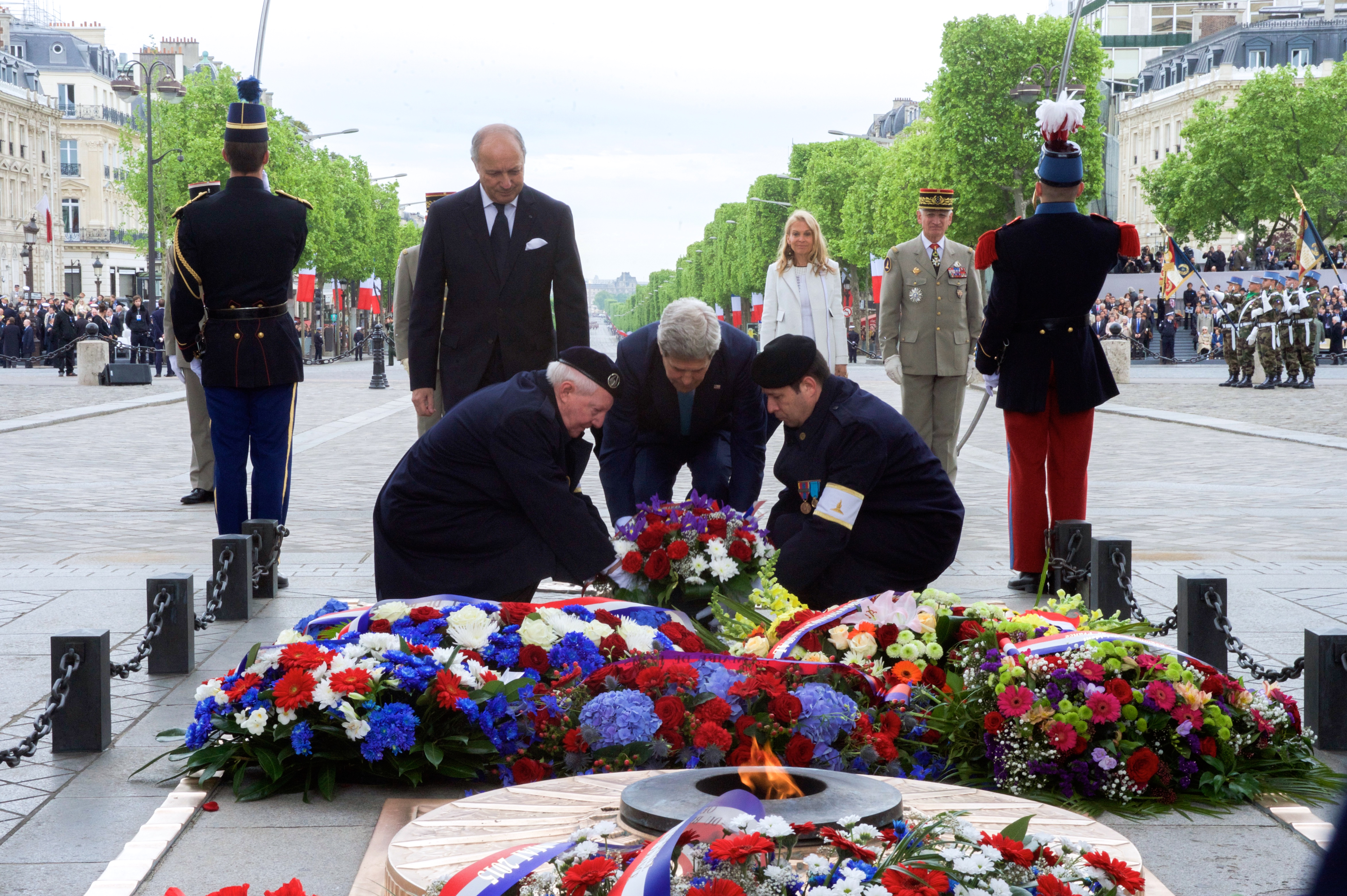
U.S. Secretary of State John Kerry lays wreath during 70th anniversary VE Day commemoration in Paris, 8 May 2015.

The idea did not really materialize until after the end of the conflict, but it first took the form of a guestbook remembering all the dead from the war: this book would be placed within the Pantheon. It went forward thanks to the press and, on 19 November 1918 Maurice Manoury, the deputy of Eure-et-Loir, made a legal proposition for this idea. The Chamber of Deputies finally adopted, on 12 September 1919, the proposal to bury "a disadvantaged man who had died" in the Pantheon.

However, the location was later shifted to the current location instead of at the Pantheon. The law was adopted unanimously by the Chamber of Deputies and the Senate.

It was André Maginot, Minister of Pensions, himself a war cripple, who presided over the ceremony of choosing the soldier to be buried. It took place in one of the legendary places of the First World War: the citadel of Verdun.

== Choosing the Unknown Soldier ==
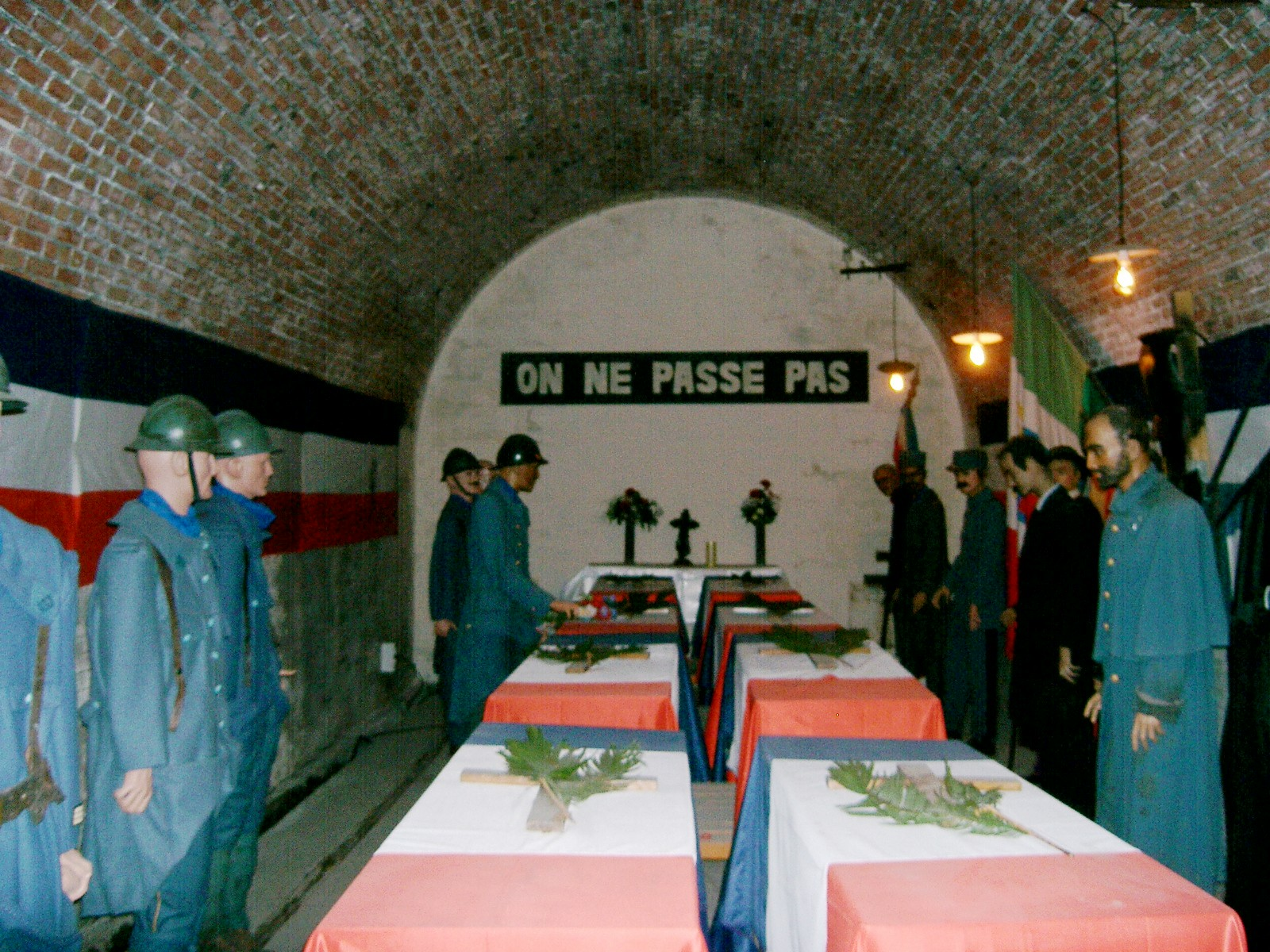
Choosing the Unknown Soldier (reconstruction at Verdun).

On 8 November 1920, Auguste Thin, a Private (Soldat de Deuxième Classe) with the 132nd Infantry Regiment, then 21 years old, was tasked with identifying the unknown soldier who would rest under the triumphal arc. Auguste Thin would later be part of the Légion des Mille.

The bodies of eight soldiers who had served under French uniform but could not be identified were exhumed in the eight regions where the deadliest fighting had taken place: in Flanders, Artois, the Somme, Île-de-France, on the Chemin des Dames, the Champagne, at Verdun, and Lorraine. Initially, nine soldiers and nine sectors had been chosen, but in one of the sectors, none of the exhumed bodies offered the guarantee of being French.

On 8 November 1920, the eight oak coffins were transferred to the citadel of Verdun, and set on three catafalques, each guarded by two veterans. On the next day they were viewed by an estimated 8,000 visitors.

On 10 November, André Maginot, Minister of Pensions, approached one of the young soldiers carrying out his duties, Auguste Thin, who had been recruited as a volunteer in the class of 1919. Thin had distinguished himself by bravery, and his own father was a missing person.

Maginot handed Thin a bouquet of white and red carnations and explained the aim of his appointment: the coffin on which this young soldier placed the bouquet would be transferred to Paris and buried under the triumphal arch.

Il me vint une pensée simple. J'appartiens au 6ème corps d'armée. En additionnant les chiffres de mon régiment, le 132, c'est également le chiffre 6 que je retiens. Ma décision est prise : ce sera le 6ème que je rencontrerai.

A simple thought occurred to me. I belong to the 6th Corps. Adding the numbers of my regiment, the 132nd, equalled the number 6 which I held onto. My decision was made: it would be the 6th coffin I come across.

— Auguste Thin

The whole event and the search for the soldier are recreated in Bertrand Tavernier's film La vie et rien d'autre (1989).

== Burial ==
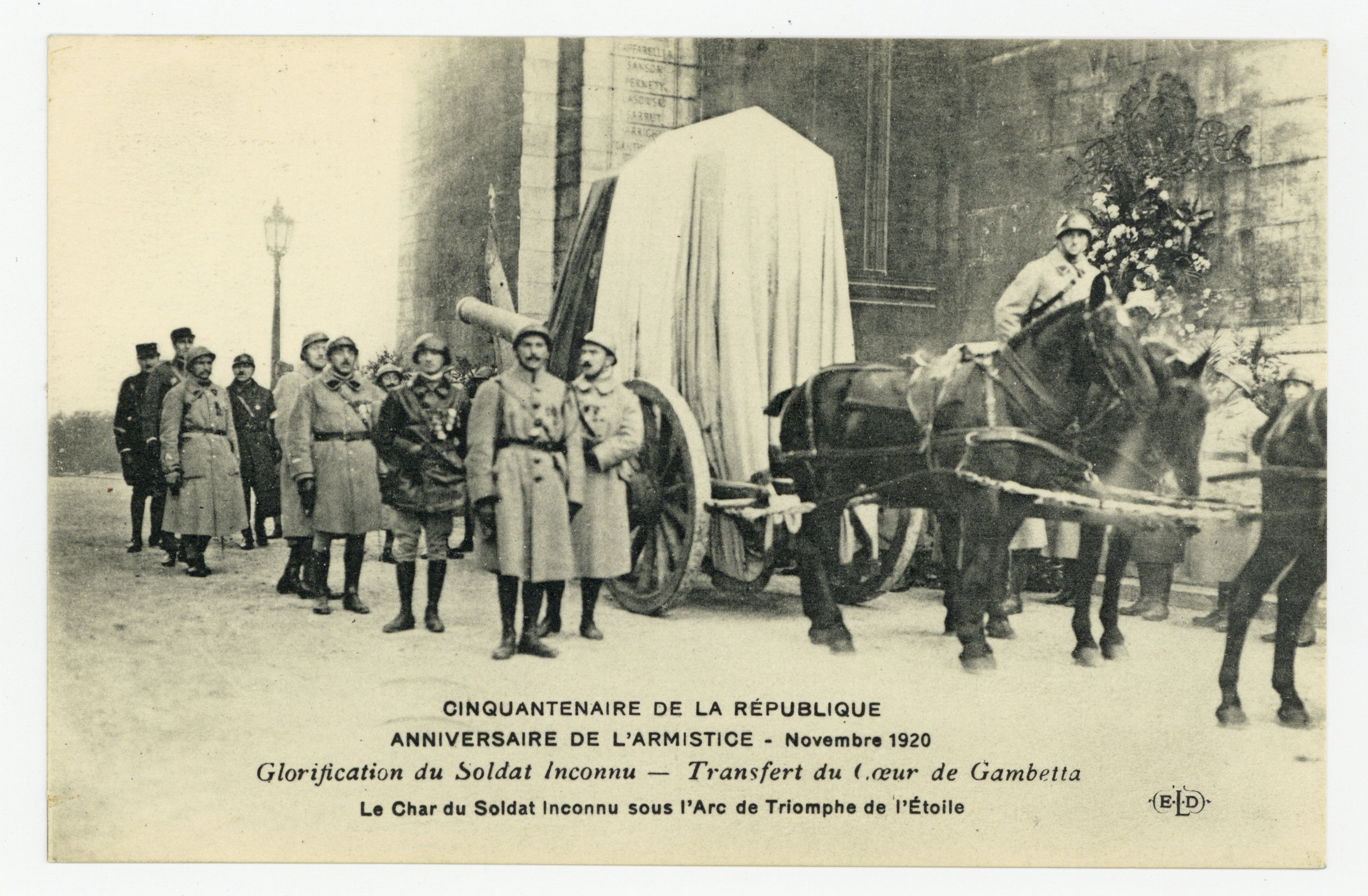
Photo from 11 November 1920.

On 10 November 1920, after Private (Soldat de Deuxième Classe) Auguste Thin had made his choice, the coffin of the Unknown Soldier left Verdun immediately, under military escort. The body was transported by train to Paris at the Panthéon, where the President of the Republic, Alexandre Millerand, delivered an address. Safeguarded all night at Place Denfert-Rochereau, the coffin made a solemn entrance under the Arc de Triomphe on Armistice Day, 11 November 1920. It was placed on the gun carriage of a cannon 155, but was not buried until 28 January 1921, in the presence of civil and military authorities, including the marshals who distinguished themselves during the First World War (Ferdinand Foch, Joseph Joffre and Philippe Pétain). Also present were: Belgian Foreign Minister Henri Jaspar, British Prime Minister David Lloyd George, and a representative of Portugal. At 8:30 am, the troops presented their arms. The Minister of War, Louis Barthou, bowed before the coffin and delivered a statement: Au nom de la France pieusement reconnaissante et unanime, je salue le Soldat inconnu qui est mort pour elle ("In the name of France piously grateful and unanimous, I salute the Unknown Soldier who died for her").

The other seven bodies not chosen at the ceremony of 10 November 1920 now rest in the Faubourg-Pavé National Cemetery, near Verdun, in the Carré des sept inconnus ("Square of the Seven Unknowns").

== The Eternal Flame ==
=== Symbolism ===
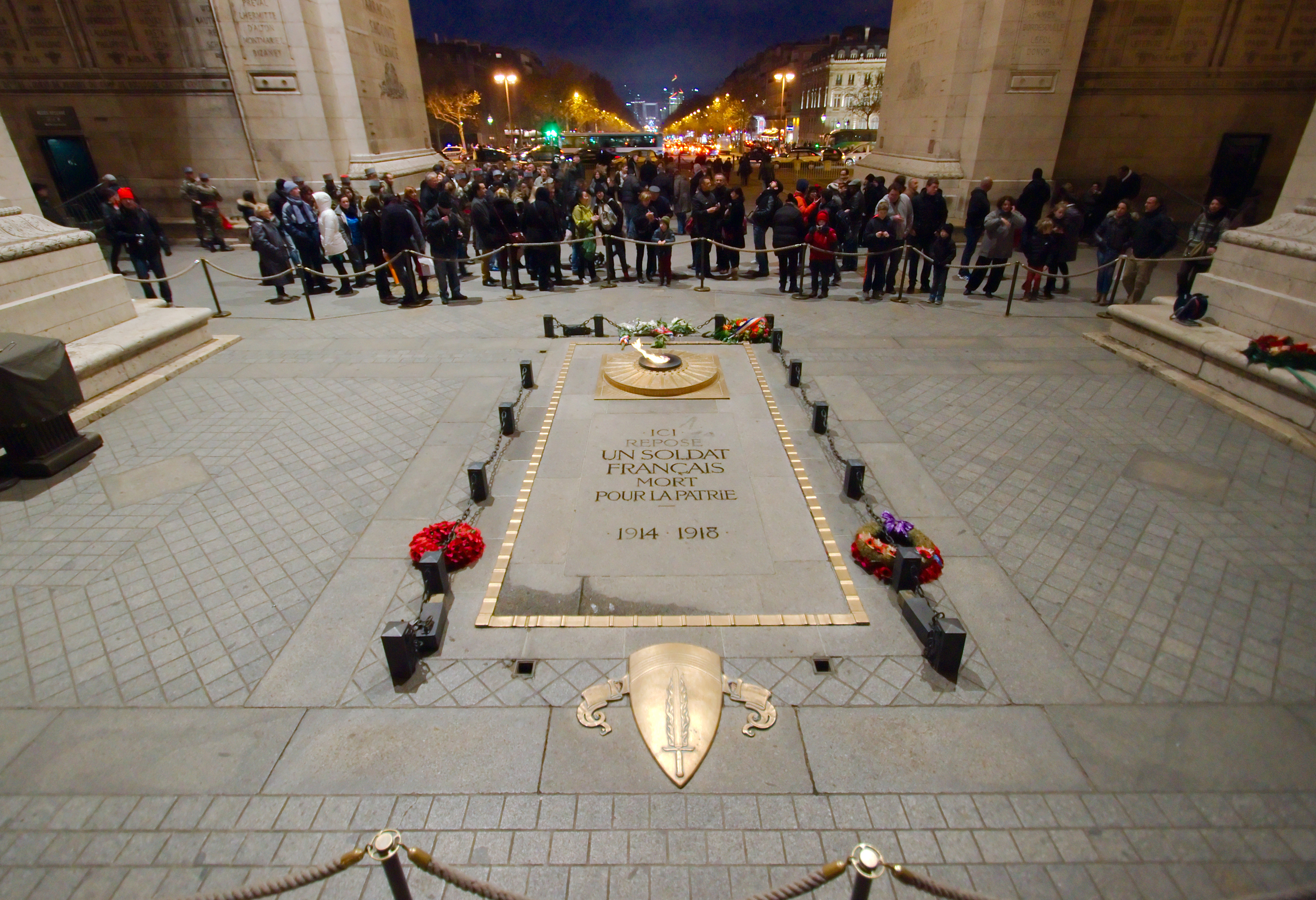
The eternal flame over the Tomb of the Unknown Soldier. The flame springs from the muzzle of a cannon taken from the enemy, placed in the centre of a bronze shield, from which radiates a frieze of chiselled swords.

The idea of burning a flame permanently was first put forward in early 1921 by the Ariège sculptor Grégoire Calvet. It was finally Augustin Beaud who initiated his installation in reference to the small lamp that illuminated the cemetery of Panossas, where he lived in his childhood, because he found the site austere with regard to the symbol that it represented. He next submitted the idea to General Henri Gouraud, military governor of Paris, and then to the municipal council, which approved it. Initially designed to be rekindled annually on 11 November, journalists Gabriel Boissy and Jacques Péricard proposed in October 1923 that it should be relit every day at 6:30 p.m. by veterans, an idea which was supported by public opinion. The plaque from which the flame arises was designed by architect Henri Favier – the muzzle of a cannon pointed towards the sky, embedded in the centre of a kind of rosette representing an inverted shield whose chiselled surface consists of swords forming a star – which was made by the artist and iron worker Edgar Brandt.

The sacred flame under the triumphal arch was lit for the first time at 6 p.m. on 11 November 1923 by André Maginot, who was then the Minister of War.

=== Rekindling ceremony ===
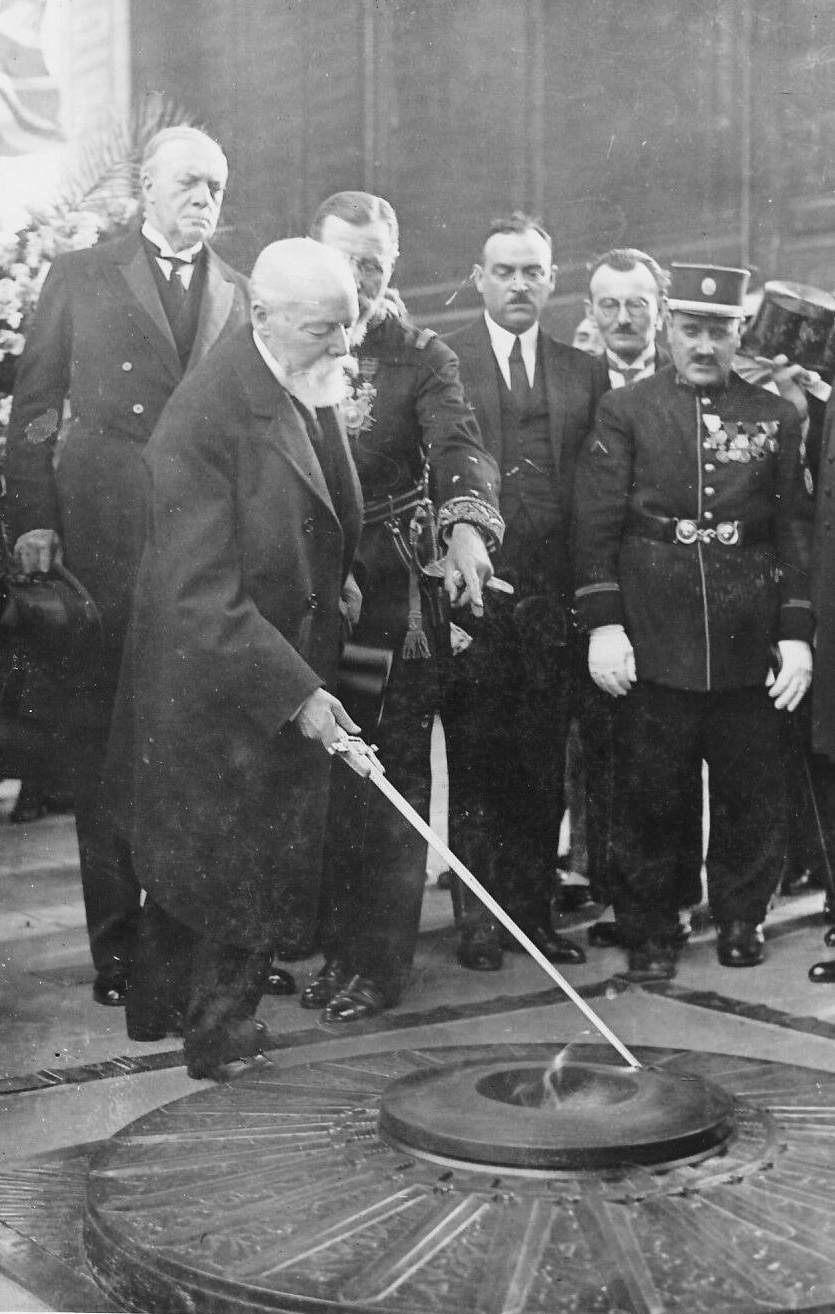
The president of the Republic, Paul Doumer, rekindling the flame on the tomb in 1931.

The rekindling of the flame at the Tomb of the Unknown Soldier has taken place at 6:30 every evening since 1923. This is performed by one of the veterans' associations.

Founded in 1925 and declared on 16 October 1930, the association La Flamme sous l'Arc de Triomphe ("The Flame under the Arc de Triomphe") designated General Gouraud, a war-maimed military governor of Paris, as its first president; he held this position until his death in 1946. The eternal flame was briefly extinguished during the 1998 World Cup by a drunk tourist.

In 2022, Lieutenant General Christophe de Saint-Chamas, Governor of Les Invalides, succeeded Bruno Dary as head of the Comité de la Flamme ("Flame Committee"), overseeing the daily rekindling of the flame.

== Linked events ==
In March 1921, the Unknown Soldier was awarded the American Medal of Honor by a special act of the US Congress.

On 23 August 1927, the execution of the anarchists Sacco and Vanzetti provoked riots in France, Japan, and South Africa. In Paris, the tomb was desecrated during the riot; this event was at the origin of the creation of the Croix-de-Feu (Cross of Fire) Political Party.

On 26 August 1970, a public demonstration by Mouvement de libération des femmes took place at the tomb. Women belonging to the Women's Liberation Movement attempted to lay a wreath under the Arc de Triomphe with the inscription: À la femme du Soldat inconnu ("To the wife of the Unknown Soldier"). Some of the banners displayed on that day had the slogan: Il y a plus inconnu que le soldat inconnu : sa femme ("There is more unknown than the unknown soldier: his wife"). This was the first media action of the movement.

On 6 August 2025, a Moroccan man, identified as 47-year-old Hakim H., was charged for using Paris' Eternal Flame to light a cigarette. He received three-months suspended prison sentence.

== In other countries ==
The idea of a symbolic Tomb of the Unknown Soldier has spread to other countries. In 1921, the United States unveiled their own Tomb of the Unknown Soldier at Arlington National Cemetery in Arlington, Virginia just across the Potomac River from Washington, D.C., while Portugal also unveiled its Túmulo do Soldado Desconhecido, and Italy its La tomba del Milite Ignoto. Many other nations have also followed the practice and created their own tombs.

== See also ==
- Tomb of the Unknown Soldier – a listing of unknown soldier memorials around the world
- Sonnerie aux morts
- Monument aux Parisiens morts pendant la Première Guerre mondiale

== Bibliography ==
- Ferreira Martins, Maria Amélia (1937). O soldado desconhecido e a chama eterna The unknown warrior and the perpetual flame = Le soldat inconnu et la flamme perpetuelle (in Portuguese). Tipo da L.C.G.G. OCLC 496904993.
- Jagielski, Jean-François (2005). Le soldat inconnu (in French). Paris: Imago. p. 248. ISBN 978-2-84952-021-5.
- Le Naour, Jean-Yves (2008). Le soldat inconnu. Histoire (in French). Paris: Gallimard. p. 111. ISBN 978-2-07-035660-7.
- Vilain, Charles (1933). Le Soldat inconnu, histoire et culte (in French). Paris: M. d'Hartoy. OCLC 494429153.

== Filmography ==
- La vie et rien d'autre (Life and Nothing But), a film by Bertrand Tavernier (1989) mentions the story of the choice of the Unknown Soldier in November 1920 (the order given to bury an anonymous soldier at the ceremony of choice among the eight coffins). The scene of the selection of the coffin has been reconstructed identically, dialogues included. There is one error: the bell ringing for the dead dates from 1931.
