= Béatrice Didier =

French literary critic

Béatrice Didier (born 21 December 1935 in La Tronche, Isère) is a French literary critic.

== Biography ==
Didier was a professor of literature and a publishing series director. She earned a literary doctorate in 1965. She is also a Professor Emeritus of École normale supérieure (ENS), where she headed a seminary exposing the relationship between literature and music.

Didier is a specialist of the French literature of the 17th and 18th centuries (especially Senancour, Chateaubriand, Stendhal and George Sand), as well as of autobiographical works.

She edited and published numerous works, and contributed to the Europe magazine. She headed the series "Écrivains", "Écriture" and "Écrit" of the Presses Universitaires de France.

She is the deputy chairwoman of the Société Chateaubriand.

== Works ==
- Fouque, Antoinette; Didier, Beatrice; Calle-Gruber, Mireille (November 2013). Le Dictionnaire universel des créatrices. France: Éditions des Femmes. ISBN 978-2-7210-0631-8.
- Chateaubriand avant le Génie du christianisme (ed.), Champion, 2006
- Oberman ou le sublime négatif (ed.), Presse de l'ENS, 2006
- Stendhal ou la dictée du bonheur, Klincksieck, 2004
- D’une gaîté ingénieuse : l’Histoire de Gil Blas roman de Lesage, Louvain; Dudley, MA: Peeters, 2004. ISBN 978-2-87723-775-8
- Gil Blas de Lesage, Gallimard, Paris, 2002
- Stendhal et l'État (dir.), Cirvi, Turin, 2002
- Le Journal intime, PUF, "Littératures modernes", 2002
- Dictionnaire de littérature grecque ancienne et moderne, PUF, series "Quadrige", ed. Béatrice Didier and Jacqueline de Romilly, 2001
- Diderot dramaturge du vivant, PUF, "Écriture", 2001
- Jean-Jacques Origas & Béatrice Didier, Dictionnaire de littérature japonaise, PUF, Quadrige, 2000
- L'Écriture-femme, PUF, "Écriture", 1999
- Choderlos de Laclos, Les Liaisons Dangereuses: Pastiche et ironie, Editions du temps, 1998
- George Sand écrivain : un grand fleuve d'Amérique, PUF, 1998
- Alphabet et raison. Le paradoxe des dictionnaires au XVIIIe siècle, PUF, "Écriture", 1996
- Histoire de la littérature française du XVIIIe siècle, Nathan, 1992 ISBN 978-2-09-190038-4
- La Littérature de la Révolution française, PUF, "Que sais-je?", No. 2418, 1988
- Le Siècle des Lumières, MA Éditions, 1987
- La Voix de Marianne, essai sur Marivaux, José Corti, 1987
- La Musique des Lumières : Diderot, l'Encyclopédie, Rousseau, PUF, 1985
- Un dialogue à distance : Gide et Du Bos, 1977
- Sade, Denoël, 1976

== Awards and distinctions ==
- Commandeur of the Ordre des Palmes académiques
- Commandeur of the National Order of Merit
- Officer of the National Order of Merit
- 1977: Académie française's Montyon Prize for her work Un dialogue à distance : Gide et Du Bos
- 1983: Grand prix de la Critique littéraire
