= Éditions des Femmes =

French publishing house

Éditions des Femmes is a French feminist press that publishes women's writings, works focused on women's issues and human rights, and audio books. It was launched in 1972 by the collective Psychanalyse et politique, led by Antoinette Fouque and funded by the patron Sylvina Boissonnas.

== History ==
Éditions des Femmes grew out of the international women in print movement, an effort by second-wave feminists to create autonomous communications networks created by and for women. The statutes of the SARL Women (a company composed of 21 members in equal parts) were filed in December 1972. The first manager was Yvonne Boissarie. Marie-Claude Grumbach (December 11, 1940 - 1 May 2001) succeeded Boissarie in June 1974. In 1979, shares were sold in favor of members Fouque, Sylvina Boissonnas and Marie-Claude Grumbach, which "represents a significant change; the equality that was the basis of the LLC is broken.".

== Publications ==
Éditions des Femmes publishes French and foreign authors, as well as "writings of yesterday". The different collections are oriented towards the human sciences (psychoanalysis, sociology, philosophy, history), fiction, biography, correspondences, poetry, theater, narrative (testimonials, memoirs), and addresses multiple themes: the feminine condition, lesbianism, feminism, and women's history, among others.

Early bestsellers included "Hosto-Blues" by Victoria Thérame and "On the Side of Little Girls" by Elena Gianini Belotti, translated from Italian.

Between 1974 and 1979, the writer Hélène Cixous published eight titles of fiction: Souffles; Portrait of Dora; Party; Angst; Wedding Preparations Beyond the Abyss; Oedipus' name, Song of the Forbidden Body; Anankè and Live Orange.

In 1993 the publisher released "Catherine Deneuve, Selected Portraits", a volume of photographs of the actress benefiting the fight against AIDS. It was edited by Antoinette Fouque and Jean-Pierre Lavoignat for Studio Magazine.

In November 2013, the publisher issued the book Le Dictionnaire universel des créatrices, edited by Béatrice Didier, Antoinette Fouque and Mireille Calle-Gruber.

== Published authors ==
Non-exhaustive list of authors:

- Claudie Cachard
- Patrizia Cavalli
- Chantal Chawaf
- Ismat Chughtai
- Hélène Cixous
- Marie Darrieussecq
- Claire de Duras
- Lidia Falcón
- Madame de La Fayette
- Lucette Finas
- Eva Forest
- Griselda Gambaro
- Xavière Gauthier
- Elizabeth January
- Apple Jouffroy
- Marina Latorre
- Eugénie Lemoine-Luccioni
- Aïcha Lemsine
- Clarice Lispector
- Françoise Maffre Castellani
- Jacqueline Merville
- Kate Millett
- Juliet Mitchell
- Erin Pizzey
- Agnès Rosenstiehl
- George Sand
- Emma Santos
- Madame de Staël
- Victoria Therame
- Marina Tsvetaeva
- Ana Vásquez-Bronfman
- Virginia Woolf

== Literary awards ==
Selected list of awarded works:

- Friendship Award Franco-Arab in 1982 awarded Ferdaous, a voice from hell and The Hidden Face of Eve by Nawal el Saadawi.
- Jean Macé Prize for Teaching 1982 awarded to Staboulkash of Victoria Thérame .
- Price of the Franco-Arab friendship in 1996 and prices Palestine Mahmoud Hamshari 1997 attributed to Peace to the inside. Palestine-Israel of Hanane Ashraoui.

== Other publications ==
The women's group also published newspapers: Women's Daily (irregular publication from November 1974 to June 1976), Women in Motion magazine monthly (December 1977 to January 1979) and weekly (101 issues with interruption, October 1979) to July 1982).

== Audiobooks ==
In 1980, Antoinette Fouque launched a collection of audio books:

At the time, there were none in France and very little, either, elsewhere. I wanted to dedicate these first talking books to my mother, daughter of emigrants, who never went to school, and to my daughter who was still complaining of not being able to read, and to all those who forbade and inhibition find neither the time nor the freedom to take a book. I think that by the ear we can go very far ... We may not have begun to think the voice yet. A voice is the Orient of the text, its beginning. The reading must liberate, make heard the voice of the text - which is not the voice of the author - which is his matrix voice, which is in him as in the tales the genie is in the bottle. Voice genius, genital, genitor of the text.

Among the famous performers who created the audiobooks, are the actors Isabelle Adjani, Fanny Ardant, Pierre Arditi, Nathalie Baye, Charles Berling, Catherine Deneuve, Gerard Depardieu, Isabelle Huppert, Jeanne Moreau, among others) and writers (Yves Bonnefoy, Jacques Derrida, Marguerite Duras, Julien Gracq, Nathalie Sarraute, and others.

== Bookstore and women's gallery ==
The first bookstore "Women" was inaugurated in Paris on May 30, 1974 at 68 rue des Saints-Pères which transferred to rue de Seine in 1981, where it includes an art gallery hosted by Marie Dedieu, which exhibits artists such as Sonia Delaunay, Milvia Maglione Françoise Martinelli, Kate Millett, Michele Knoblauch, Sophie Clavel, Tina Modotti, Claude Batho, Ilse Bing, Louise Nevelson, June Wayne, Popy Moreni, Mary Orensanz, Colette Alvarez-Urbajtel This bookshop-gallery closed in 1999, and reopened in rue Jacob, accompanied by a "women's space".

In 1976, a women's bookstore was opened in Marseille, and another in Lyon in 1977, but closed thereafter.

== See also ==
- Antoinette Fouque
- Women's Liberation Movement
- Women in print movement

== Bibliography ==
- Annie Dizier-Metz, History of a Woman, Memory of Women, The Marguerite Durand Library, 1992.
- Sylvina Boissonnas (eds.), Women's Memory 1974-2004. For 30 years women have been publishing ..., women's edition, 2006, third edition.
- Bibia Pavard, Women's Publishing. History of the first years, 1972-1979, L'Harmattan, 2005.
- MLF Generation, Women's Issues, 2008.
- MLF generation, ed. Women, Paris, 2008, p. 160 .
- "Marie Dedieu, feminist pioneer" on Le Monde.fr (accessed February 27, 2018) [archive]
- Facsimile catalog of women's gallery 1981-1982, For thirty years women publish, ed. Women, Paris, 2004, p. 352-403.
- MLF generation, collective, ed. Women, 2008, p. 225 .
- Kate Millett, Going to Iran, photographs of Sophie Keir Coward, McCann & Geoghegan, New York, 1982; In Iran, ed. women, 1979.
- Jean Gueyras, Manifestations of women bring Ayatollah Khomeini to nuance its position on the "Islamic veil", Le Monde, March 13, 1979, p. 4.
- Dominique Pouchin, Western feminists mobilize, Le Monde, March 22, 1979, p. 6.
- Kate Millett, Going to Iran, in Iran, op. cit.
- Claudine Mulard, "Tehran, March 1979 with camera and without veil, shooting Journal," Modern Times no. 661, November–December 2010, p. 161-177.
- Mahnaz Matine, Nasser Mohajer, Iranian Women's Uprising, March 8, 1979, Noghteh Books, 2010 (ISBN 978-0-9828408-0-1).
- Huisman, Marijka; van Vught, Inge Frank (2024). "Women in Print: Transnational Circulation of Idea(l)s from a Dutch Perspective". In Andeweg, Agnes; Kurvinen, Heidi (eds.). Transnational Feminism in Non-English Speaking Europe, c. 1960-1990. Palgrave Macmillan. pp. 135–154. ISBN 9783031691386.
