= Dictionary of Women Worldwide =

Dictionary of women's biographies

Dictionary of Women Worldwide: 25,000 Women Throughout the Ages
- Editors: Anne Commire; Deborah Klezmer
- Language: English
- Subject: Women's biography
- Publisher: Yorkin Publications
- Publication date: 2006
- Pages: 2572
- ISBN: 978-0-7876-7585-1

Dictionary of Women Worldwide: 25,000 Women Throughout the Ages is a biographical dictionary of women. Published in 2006 by Yorkin Publications (an imprint of Gale), the three-volume Dictionary was intended to redress the paucity of information on women available in other biographical dictionaries. Editors Anne Commire and Deborah Klezmer found that typically five percent or less of the text of such works was devoted to women.

The dictionary was the winner of the 2007 Best Reference Book Award from the American Library Association.

== Content ==
The first two volumes of the dictionary contain entries on women across millennia and the third volume is devoted to indexes. The book also contains 85 genealogical charts. The dictionary does not contain author or source information; however, 10,000 entries refer the reader to the editors' 17-volume Women in World History which contains more detail. The Dictionary of Women Worldwide series served as an expansion of the prior multi-volume work, though the entries were made shorter in length by comparison.

Each entry generally contains biographical information including birth date and death date, occupation, any pseudonyms used and, if married, whom their spouse and children were, and then a general description of their life and accomplishments. The time span covered includes as far back as 3100 BC up through the 20th century. The indices separate the entries into different formats, including time period, type of occupation, and geographical location. Page numbers of the entries, however, are not included within these indices themselves, so must be searched for alphabetically within the relevant volume.

== Critical reception ==
In a review for Feminist Collections: A Quarterly of Women's Studies Resources, Vicki Tobias wrote, "As a reference resource, the Dictionary of Women Worldwide succeeds where other similar works fall short." She particularly praised the length and detail of the entries, which often include name variations, marriages and "female lineage, an often insurmountable task, yet critical for establishing accurate biographical information about women ... the Dictionary of Women Worldwide is an admirable 'first stop' resource and offers scholars at all levels a much-needed starting point for more indepth research."

== See also ==
- Le Dictionnaire universel des créatrices
- Women in World History
