= Maurice Schmitt =

Maurice Schmitt
- Born: 23 January 1930 (age 96); France
- Military career
- Allegiance: France
- Branch: French Army
- Service years: 1948 – 1996
- Rank: Général d'armée
- Conflicts: Indochina War; Algerian War; Gulf War
- Other work: Governor of Les Invalides (1991–1996)

Maurice Schmitt (born 23 January 1930 at Marseille, Bouches-du-Rhône), is a French general and chief of the general staff headquarters of the Armies (CEMA) from 16 November 1987 until 23 April 1991. He was then appointed as Governor of Les Invalides until 1996.

== Biography ==
=== Early life ===
Maurice is the son of général Gaston Schmitt.

=== Military career ===
He entered the École spéciale militaire de Saint-Cyr in October 1948. After attending a course at the artillery school, he was assigned to the 1st Colonial Artillery Regiment (1^{er} RAC), Troupes coloniales (known as Troupes de marine since 1958), whose barracks was at Melun.

Designated to serve in the Far East in January 1953, he was assigned to the 4th Colonial Artillery Regiment 4^{e} RAC, then the North-West Operational Artillery Group (GONO), the designated name of the garrison of Dien Bien Phu. During the subsequent battle, he was taken as a prisoner of war on 7 May 1954. He was released on 2 September 1954.

Knight Order of the Order of the Légion d'honneur at 25, he became a military instructor at the infantry application school until September 1956, he was then assigned to the 3rd Colonial Parachute Regiment (3^{e} RPC) in North Africa where he commanded a combat support company from 1958 until October 1959. In 1959, he was made an Officer of the Order of the Légion d'honneur at 29.

Following these engagements, his name often came up and was cited when the torture practices were evoked during the Algerian war.

Promoted to colonel in 1974, then Général de brigade in 1979, he became Chief of Staff of the French Army in 1985, then Chef d'état-major des Armées in 1987 responsible for French forces during the Gulf War in 1990 and 1991. He was replaced by Admiral Jacques Lanxade on 23 April 1991.

In 1990, he was elevated to the dignity of Grand-Cross of the Légion d'honneur and became Governor of Les Invalides in 1991, until 1996.

== Recognitions and Honors ==
=== French honours ===
- Grand Cross of the Légion d'honneur
- Commander of the Ordre national du Mérite
- Cross for Military Valour
- Croix de guerre des théâtres d'opérations extérieures
- Colonial Medal
- 1939–1945 Commemorative war medal (France)
- Indochina Campaign Commemorative Medal
- North Africa Security and Order Operations Commemorative Medal

=== Foreign honours ===
- First Class Commander of the Order of the White Rose of Finland
- Commander of the Order of Merit of the Federal Republic of Germany
- Grand Officer of the National Order of the Cedar (Lebanon)
- Grand Cross of the Royal Norwegian Order of Merit (Norway)
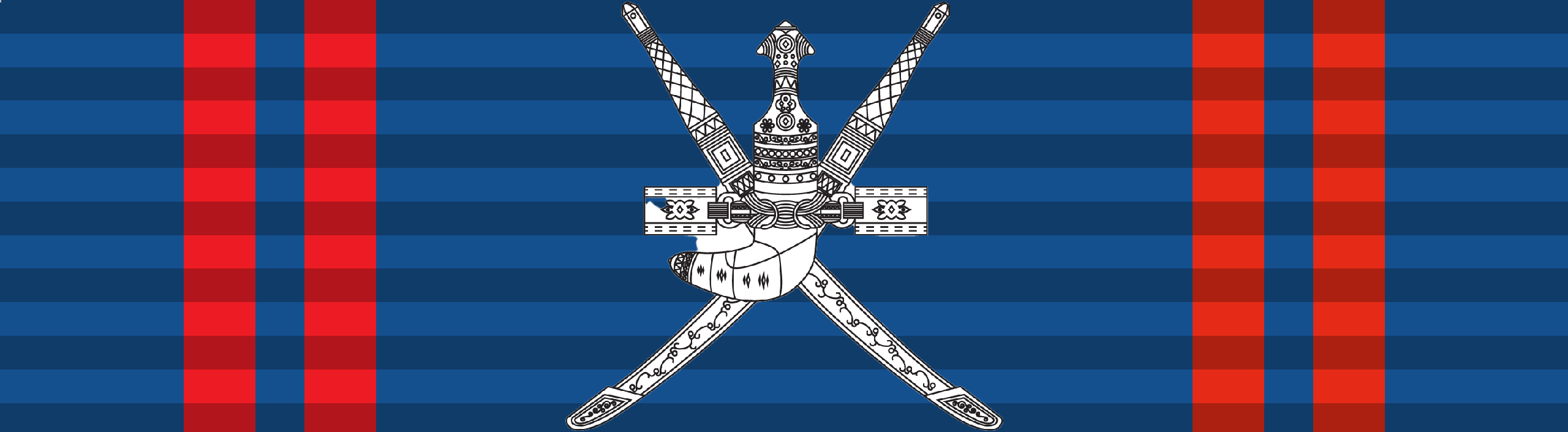
- Second Class of the Military Order of Oman
- Nishan-e-Imtiaz (Pakistan)
- Kuwait Liberation Medal (Saudi Arabia)
- First Class of the Order of National Security Merit (South Korea)
- Grand Officer of the Order of the Republic (Tunisia)
- Commander of the Legion of Merit (USA)
- Medal of the Order of Naval Merit (Venezuela)

== Publications ==
- Deuxième bataille d'Alger, 2002-2007, la bataille judiciaire (The second battle of Algiers), L'Harmattan, 2008
- Alger-été 1957: une victoire sur le terrorisme (Algiers summer of 1957 : a victory against terrorism), L'Harmattan, 2002
- Le double jeu du maréchal: légende ou réalité(The double game of the marshal: legend or reality), Presses de la Cité, 1996
- De Diên Biên Phu à Koweït City (From Dien Bien Phu to Kuwait City), Grasset, 1992
