= Jean-Toussaint Arrighi de Casanova =

French diplomat and soldier

Jean-Toussaint Arrighi de Casanova duc de Padoue
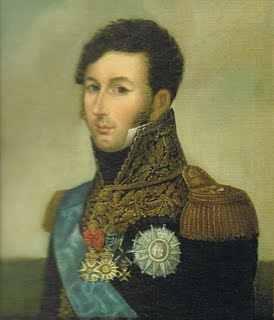
- General Arrighi de Casanova
- Born: 8 March 1778; Corte, France
- Died: 22 March 1853 (aged 75); Paris, France
- Relatives: Cousin (in law) of Napoleon Bonaparte
- Military career
- Allegiance: France
- Service years: 1796–1814
- Rank: General of Division
- Commands: Cavalry, Infantry
- Conflicts: French Revolutionary Wars; Napoleonic Wars
- Awards: Duc de Padoue
- Other work: Deputy, Senator; Governor of Les Invalides (1852-1853)

Jean-Toussaint Arrighi de Casanova, duc de Padoue (French pronunciation: [ʒɑ̃ tusɛ̃ aʁiɡi də kazanɔva]; born 8 March 1778 in Corte; died 22 March 1853 in Paris), Duke of Padova, was a French diplomat and soldier of the French Revolutionary and Napoleonic Wars. In the late 1840s, Arrighi was also involved in politics and was elected deputy and then senator in the French Parliament. He was a second cousin of Napoleon I of France.

== Early life and Revolutionary Wars ==
Born in Corsica at Corte, Arrighi became a student of the military school of Rebais in 1787 and then a student of the university of Pisa, before returning to Corsica in 1796. Being the husband of one of Napoleon Bonaparte's cousins, Arrighi became a lieutenant in the Army of Italy and was directly attached to Bonaparte. He then became secretary of the French legation in Rome while Joseph Bonaparte was the local French ambassador. Returning to military life, he joined Bonaparte for the Egyptian campaign, was wounded at Salahieh, modern day El Salheya bordering the Sinai Desert and also took part in the sieges of Jaffa and Acre and was promoted to captain. During the siege of Acre, a bullet clipped Bonaparte's hat and went on to strike Arrighi in the throat, cutting an artery. Surgeon Dominique Jean Larrey believed the wound to be fatal. Nevertheless, the surgeon ministered to the wounded officer and saved his life. Arrighi returned to France just in time for the 1800 Italian campaign and fought in the Battle of Marengo.

== Napoleonic Wars and Bourbon Restoration ==
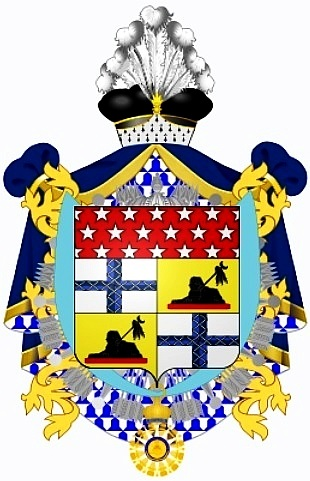
Heraldic achievement of Jean-Toussaint Arrighi de Casanova, duc de Padoue with the insignia of Grand Cross of the Order of the Reunion

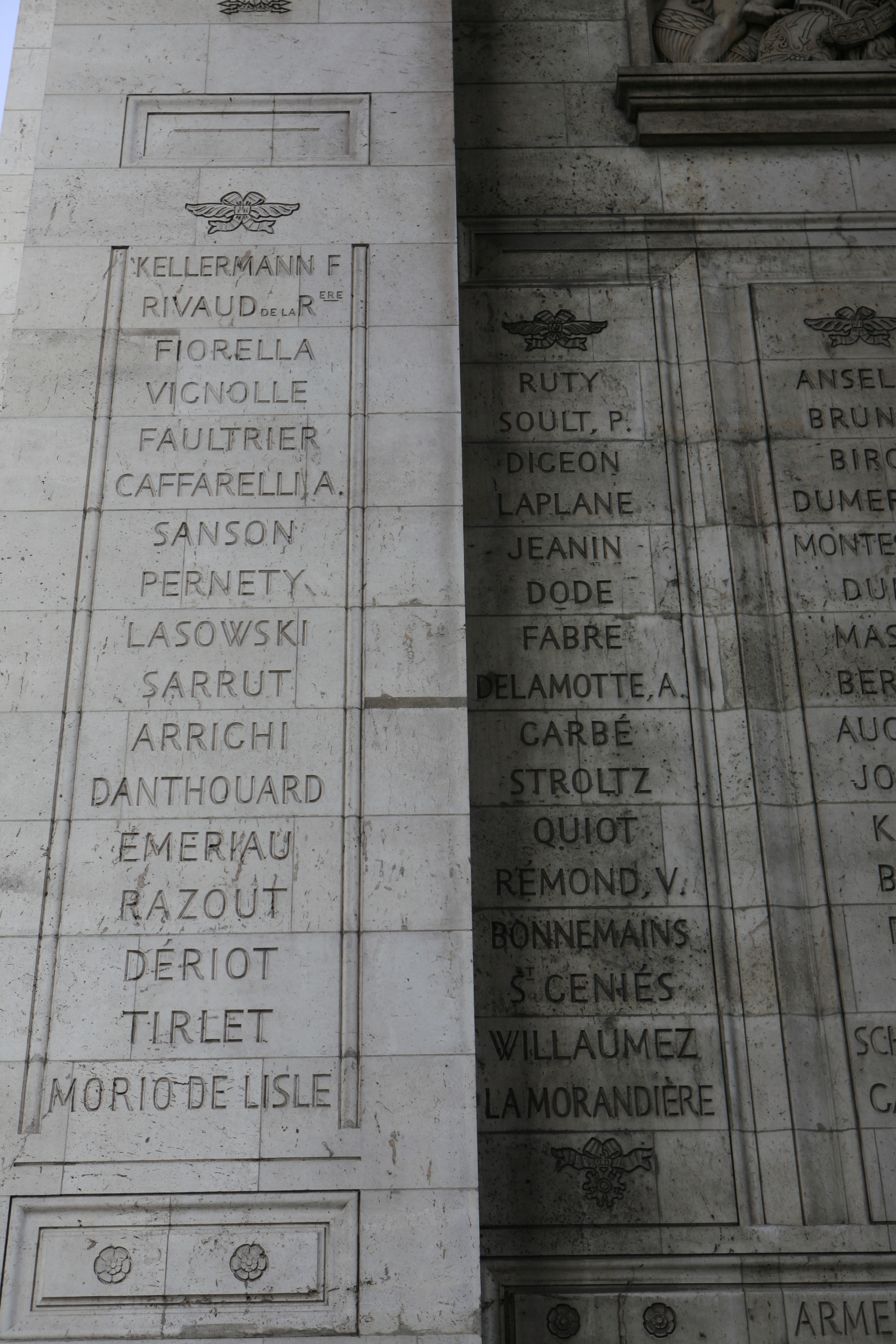
Arrighi's name is inscribed on the Arc de Triomphe (7th from bottom on the left).

Five years later, after the outbreak of the War of the Third Coalition, Arrighi was named aide-de-camp to Marshal of the Empire Louis Alexandre Berthier and received a wound at the battle of Wertingen but was nonetheless present at the battle of Austerlitz two months later. In 1806 he was named Major-colonel of the Guard dragoons and fought in the War of the Fourth Coalition throughout 1806 and 1807 and was promoted to brigadier general on the field at the Battle of Friedland. The next year, in 1808, Arrighi was made duc de Padoue (duke of Padua) and was sent to Spain with the cavalry of the Guard. Returning to France, he served in the newly assembled Army of Germany and fought the Austrians at the bloody battles of Aspern-Essling and Wagram. In 1810 he became a general inspector of cavalry and two years later he was given the command of all French troops on the North Sea coastline, from the Somme to the Elbe. Commanding the III Cavalry Corps, he fought in a number of battles between the Elbe and the Rhine and was governor of Leipzig during the epic Battle of Nations. During the 1814 Campaign in France, Arrighi was given command of an infantry division and covered Marshal Auguste de Marmont's retreat at the Battle of La Fère Champenoise and then took part in the Battle of Paris.

During the Hundred Days Napoleon sent him to Corsica and after the Emperor's abdication, Arrighi sought exile in Italy. He was only allowed back in France in 1819 and in 1849 became a deputy of Corsica in the National Assembly of France, before being elected a senator. Arrighi's last position was Governor of the Invalides.

== Recognition ==
His name appears on the Arc de Triomphe in Paris. He was a Chevalier in the Legion of Honour and a Grand Cross in the Order of the Reunion. Bavaria made him a Knight in the Military Order of Max Joseph.

== Ancestry ==
Ancestors of Jean-Toussaint Arrighi de Casanova

8. Antonio Battista Arrighi de Casanova
4. Giovan-Tomaso Arrighi de Casanova
9. Maddalena de Signorio
2. Hyacinthe Arrighi de Casanova
10. Teodoro Biadelli
5. Maria Anna Biadelli
1. Jean-Toussaint Arrighi de Casanova
12. Marc Ariotto Benielli
6. Giacinto Benielli
13. Maria Maddalena Cuneo d' Ornano
3. Marie-Antoinette Benielli
14. Giuseppe Maria Pietrasanta
7. Maria Anna Pietrasanta
15. Maria Giuseppa Malerba
