= Marie-Jo Bonnet =

French art historian

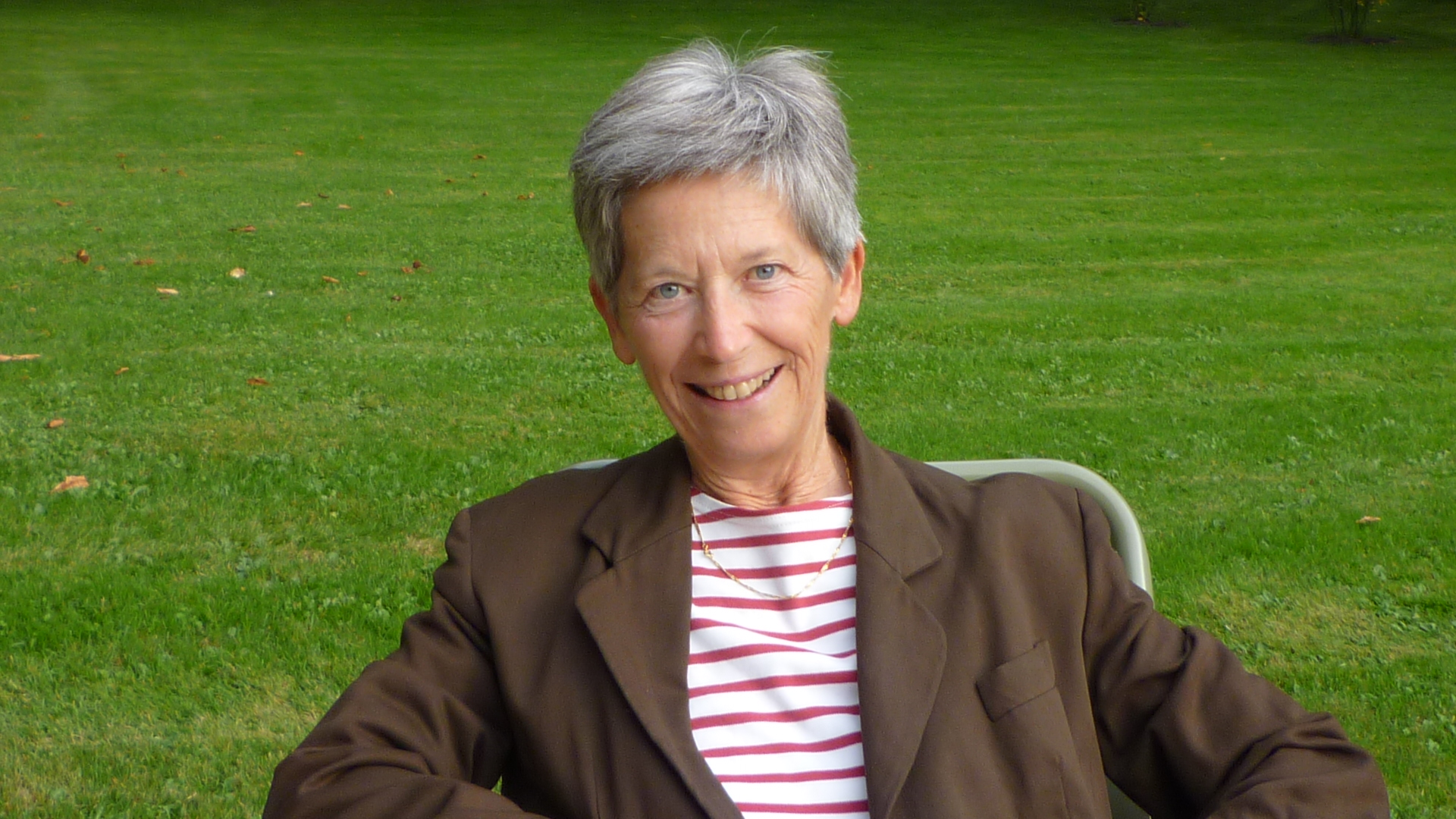
- Born: Marie-Josèphe Bonnet; 1949 (age 76–77); Deauville, France

Academic background
- Education: Paris Diderot University
- Thesis: Les relations amoureuses entre les femmes du xvie au xxe siècle (1995)
- Doctoral advisor: Michelle Perrot

Academic work
- Discipline: Women's history, Art history

Marie-Josèphe Bonnet (born 1949 in Deauville) is a French specialist in the history of women, history of art, and history of lesbians. She has also published books in the history of the French resistance and occupation.

== Biography ==
=== Academic career ===
Bonnet obtained a BA in history at the Pantheon-Sorbonne University, and went on to get her Master and PhD from Paris Diderot University. Working with Michelle Perrot she published her thesis, Romantic Relations between women of the 16th and 20th centuries (French: Les relations amoureuses entre les femmes du xvie au xxe siècle), in 1995.

As a doctor of history, Bonnet has taught art history at Columbia University and Carleton University (in Paris), and hosted several radio and television programs for France Culture France Inter, and France 2. As an art historian, Bonnet has written several books and various articles, participating in conferences about the theme of art, women artists, and the representation of women in art. Bonnet has never had a permanent academic position in France, despite being one of the first professionally trained historians working in LGBT history.

== Associations ==
In 1971, Bonnet was a member of the Women's Liberation Movement (French: Mouvement de libération des femmes), and a founding member of both the Front homosexuel d'action révolutionnaire and the Gouines rouges. She was a part of recording several songs of the, including the Hymne du MLF.

In 1974, she joined La Spirale founded by the artist Charlotte Calmis, and later helped found the Charlotte Calmis Association.

Bonnet is a member of the Société des gens de lettres, and the current president of the Lire à Pont-L'Evêque.

She opposes surrogacy, and is a member of the Collectif pour le respect de la personne.

Bonnet was instrumental in the rediscovery of the French Resistance work by Éveline Garnier and Andrée Jacob, which led to two pathways being named in their honour in 2019.

== Selected works ==
- Un choix sans équivoque, Paris, Denoël-Gonthier, 1981.
- Les Relations amoureuses entre les femmes du XVI au XX (reissued in a pocket edition by Les Éditions Odile Jacob in
- Les Deux Amies: essai sur le couple de femmes dans l'art, Paris, éditions Blanche, 2000. ISBN 2-911621-94-8
- Qu'est-ce qu'une femme désire quand elle désire une femme?, Odile Jacob, 2004. ISBN 978-2738114457
- Les Femmes dans l'art, éditions de La Martinière Groupe, 2004. ISBN 978-2-732-43087-4
- Les Femmes artistes dans les avant-gardes, Odile Jacob, 2006. ISBN 978-2-7381-1732-8
- Les voix de la Normandie combattante - Été 1944, Éditions Ouest-France, 2010. ISBN 978-2-7373-5079-5.
- Violette Morris, histoire d'une scandaleuse, Perrin, 2011. ISBN 978-2-2620-3557-0
- Histoire de l'émancipation des femmes, Éditions Ouest-France, 2012. ISBN 978-2-7373-5364-2
- Liberté égalité exclusion, Femmes peintres en révolution 1770-1804, Ed. Vendémiaire, 2012. ISBN 978-2-36358-041-2
- Tortionnaires, truands et collabos. La bande de la rue de la Pompe 1944, Ed. Ouest-France, 2013. ISBN 978-2737360428
- Adieu les rebelles!, Édition Flammarion- Café Voltaire, 2014. ISBN 978-2081312630
- Plus forte que la mort. L'amitié féminine dans les camps. Ed. Ouest-France 2015. (ISBN 978-2-7373-6649-9)
- Simone de Beauvoir et les femmes, Ed. Albin Michel. ISBN 9-782226-3167-14
- Un réseau normand sacrifié, Manipulations anglaises sur un groupe de résistants infiltré par les Allemands, Ed. Ouest-France, 2016, ISBN 978-2-737-37006-9
