= Christophe de Saint-Chamas =

Christophe de Saint Chamas
- Born: 5 January 1959 (age 67); France
- Military career
- Allegiance: France
- Branch: French Army
- Service years: 1978–present
- Rank: Général de corps d'armée
- Commands: 1st Foreign Cavalry Regiment; 1^{er} REC Commandement de la Légion Étrangère
- Other work: Governor of Les Invalides (2017–present)

Christophe de Saint Chamas is a Général de corps d'armée of the French Army and Commandant of the Foreign Legion.

== Military career ==
Saint-Cyrien of the promotion « Général Paul-Frédéric Rollet » (1978–1980).

Candidate of the 107th promotion of the superior course of the general staff headquarters (French: cours supérieur d'état-major), then the 2nd promotion of the Inter-arm Defense College (French: collège Interarmées de Défense), in addition, he is the auditor (French: auditeur) of the 55th session of the Center of High Military Studies (French: Session du Centre des Hautes Etudes Militaires) and 58th session of the Institute of High Studies of National Defense (French: session de l'Institut des Hautes Etudes de Défense Nationale) between 2005 and 2006.

Cavalry officer, he served in the 12th Chasseurs Regiment (French: 12^{ème} Régiment de Chasseurs) at Sedan, then in the 1st Dragoon Regiment (French: 1^{er} Régiment de Dragons) at Lure where he participated to the first Gulf War (Operation Daguet).

He was assigned to the Legion on three occasions.

In 1984, Chef de peloton then Captain at the 1st Foreign Cavalry Regiment 1^{er} REC at Orange, he was engaged in exterior missions in Mayotte, Tchad and in the Central African Republic.

In 1995, Lieutenant-colonel and instruction operations bureau chief at the 1st Foreign Cavalry Regiment 1^{er} REC, he was deployed to Tchad twice within the cadre of Operation Epervier and participated to the evacuation of French nationals from Condo Brazzaville in 1997 (Operation Pelican).

At the general staff headquarters of the Armies (French: l'état-major des armées) from 1997 to 2000, he took part to the planning and conduit of operations led in Bosnia and Herzegovina, in Kosovo and in Macedonia, at the corps of the crisis cell « Yougoslavie » of the inter-arm operational center.

He joined later the cabinet of the minister of defense (French: cabinet du ministre de la défense) and was accordingly promoted to rank of Colonel on 1 October 2000. He was entrusted for three years the functions of assistant (French: adjoint) of the Land Force contingent.

In 2003, Colonel regimental commander of the 1st Foreign Cavalry Regiment 1^{e} REC until 2005, he commanded an inter-arm tactical group (GTIA) at the corps of Operation Licorne in the Republic of the Ivory Coast, from June to October 2004.

In 2006, he served in the Inter-arm Center of Experimentations for Concepts and Doctrines (French: Centre Interarmées de Concepts de Doctrines et d’Expérimentations) and became the planning assistant and chief of the J5 at the center of planning and operations conduit in June 2007.

Designated as Général de brigade on 1 August 2009, he was sent to Afghanistan as chief of the planning and strategy bureau (CJ5) of the general staff headquarters of the international assistance and security force (ISAF) (French: l’état-major de la Force Internationale d’Assistance et de Sécurité, FIAS) at Kaboul from February 2010 to March 2011.

He assumed command of the Legion on 1 September 2011. He was designated as Général de division on 1 April 2013.

On 1 August 2014 général de Saint Chamas has been nominated as the officer general of Defense and Security Zone West and Commandant of region North-West as a Général de corps d'armée.

As of 1 July 2017, Général de corps d'armée de Saint-Chamas has been nominated as the Governor of Les Invalides (French: Gouverneur des Invalides).

In March 2022 he succeeded Bruno Dary as head of the Comité de la Flamme, overseeing the rekindling of the Eternal Flame at the Tomb of the Unknown Soldier.

== Recognitions and Honors ==

- Officier of the Légion d'honneur
- Commandeur de l'ordre national du Mérite
- Croix de guerre des théâtres d'opérations extérieures (1 star)
- Croix de la Valeur militaire (1 star)
- Croix du combatant
- Medaille d'Outre-Mer ( 4 agrafes-clasps )
- Médaille de la Défense nationale
- Medaille de Reconnaissance de la Nation (d'Afrique du Nord)
- Médaille commémorative française
- 2 decorations
- Kuwait Liberation Medal (Saudi Arabia)
- Kuwait Liberation Medal (Kuwait)
- 2 decorations
