= Mouvement de libération des femmes =

French women's liberation movement

The Mouvement de libération des femmes (MLF; transl. Women's Liberation Movement) is a French autonomous, single-sex feminist movement that advocates women's bodily autonomy and challenges patriarchal society. It was founded in 1970, in the wake of the American Women's liberation movement and the events of May 1968. The movement challenges traditional forms of militancy: it operates through general assemblies, small decentralized groups and has a repertoire of extra-parliamentary actions such as the organization of events, the creation and signing of petitions, the holding of public meetings, etc.

== History ==
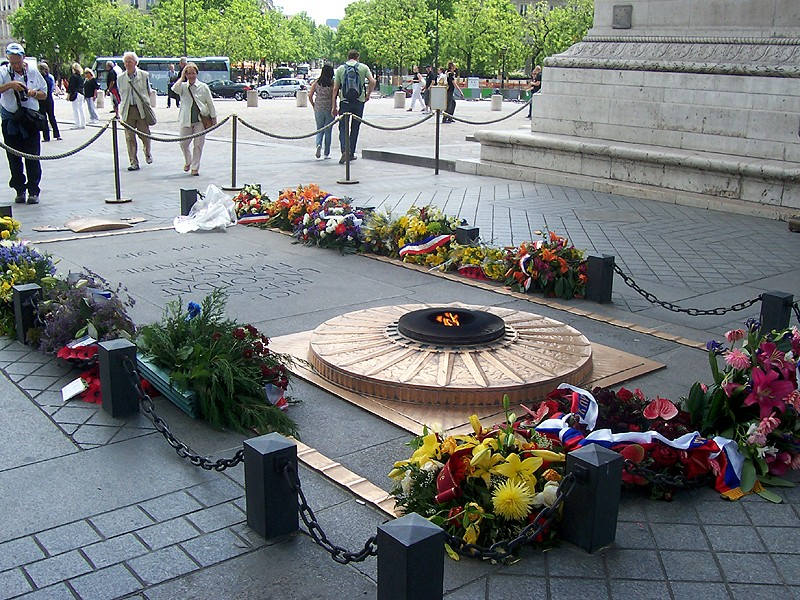
The Tomb of the Unknown Soldier

On 26 August 1970, a group of activists attempted to lay a wreath under the Arc de Triomphe in memory of the wife of the Unknown Soldier. This action was led by nine women, including Cathy Bernheim, Christine Delphy, Monique Wittig, Christiane Rochefort and Namascar Shaktini. Their banners displayed this phrase: "There is more unknown than the unknown soldier: his wife". They were immediately arrested by the police, but the next day the press announced "the birth of the MLF".

At its origins, the MLF was neither a movement nor a political party: no leader was tolerated. The movement is composed by collectives and small groups. The feminist militants want to fight in all fronts, based on the principle that "the private is political". They reject the ideals of beauty imposed by the patriarchal diktat, claim for nurseries, ask their partners to share domestic tasks. The sexual revolution has gone through it: they denounce rape, incest and sexual assault, and fight for abortion.

One of the first actions of the movement was to support the rebellion in the center for pregnant teenagers from Plessis-Robinson, who were between 13 and 17 years old. At the end of 1971, the residents began, with the help of the MLF, on a hunger strike to refuse the fate that was imposed on them: excluded from their school, marginalized by their own family, mistreated. Alerted by the MLF, Simone de Beauvoir went to meet them, accompanied by journalists.

== Currents ==
The MLF came to be known by three main currents: Féministes révolutionnaires, Psychanalyse et politique and Lutte de classes.

=== Psychanalyse et politique ===
Psychanalyse et politique, or Psych et po, was a MLF research group founded by Antoinette Fouque. The group is at the origin of Éditions des Femmes, the magazine Des femmes en movements, the newspaper Le Quotidien des femmes, and bookstores in Paris, Marseille and Lyon. In addition to Fouque, notable members included Hélène Cixous and Luce Irigaray.

Psych et po was my concern to understand what was unconscious in the political commitments of the time, as well as to flush out the power of psychoanalysis, not only in institutions and schools, but in the discovery of the unconscious and its theorization. It seemed vital to me that one should know and question the other, and vice versa. To put it briefly, there was the unconscious in politics and politics on the side of the unconscious.

— Antoinette Fouque

Openly antifeminist, Psych et po was involved in several controversies with other MLF groups, such as the registration of ownership of the name mouvement de libération des femmes in 1979.

== Publications ==
=== Le torchon brûle ===
Le torchon brûle was a newspaper published by MLF members between May 1971 and June 1973, with a zero issue published in December 1970. The idea for the newspaper came from a general assembly of the MLF at the École des Beaux-Arts in Paris. Marie Dedieu is credited as the publication's director.

=== Questions féministes ===
Questions féministes was a feminist journal published from 1977 to 1980. It was founded by a group of feminists that included Simone de Beauvoir, Christine Delphy, Colette Capitan, Colette Guillaumin, Emmanuèle de Lesseps, Nicole-Claude Mathieu, Monique Plaza, and later Monique Wittig.

== Economic and political progress ==
The women of the women's liberation movement profoundly transformed society and values during the second half of the twentieth century. They encouraged a considerable change in the conception of women's rights, in particular the reforms on the birth control, professional and parental equality, and the law on parity.
