= Namascar Shaktini =

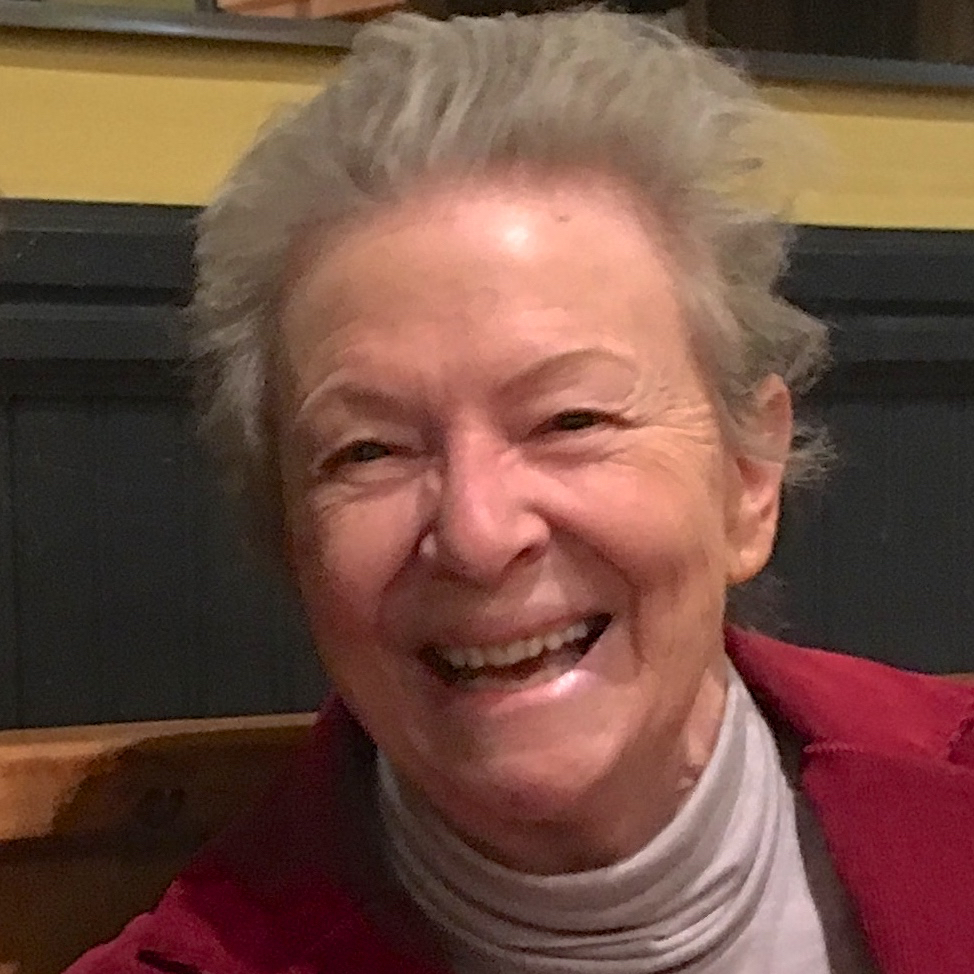
- Shaktini in 2019
- Born: 8 January 1939 (age 87); Atlanta, Georgia, United States
- Education: University of California, Santa Cruz
- Occupations: Academic, Author, Activist

Namascar Shaktini (born Margaret Clarice Orr; 8 January 1939) is an American academic and professor of French and comparative literature. During her time in Paris, she went by the name Margaret Stephenson.

== Education ==
She holds a PhD from the University of California, Santa Cruz, where she wrote a thesis titled The Problem of Gender and Subjectivity Posed by the New Subject Pronoun "j/e" in the Writing of Monique Wittig.

== Activism ==
Shaktini played a key role in the founding of the Mouvement de libération des femmes (MLF) while conducting her doctoral research in Paris under the supervision of Roland Barthes.

In August 1970, she participated in the laying of flowers for the wife of the Unknown Soldier and was arrested by the police.

== Publications ==
=== Edited collections ===
- On Monique Wittig: Theoretical, Political, and Literary Essays, Urbana and Chicago, University of Illinois Press, 2005. (Ed. Namascar Shaktini).

=== Chapters ===
- "Introduction to 'For a Women’s Liberation Movement'", in On Monique Wittig: Theoretical, Political, and Litterary Essays, Urbana and Chicago, University of Illinois Press, 2005. (Ed. Namascar Shaktini).
- "The Critical Mind and The Lesbian Body", in On Monique Wittig: Theoretical, Political, and Litterary Essays, Urbana and Chicago, University of Illinois Press, 2005. (Ed. Namascar Shaktini).
- "Le projet matérialiste du Corps lesbien et son matériau anatomique", in Lire Monique Wittig aujourd’hui, Presses universitaires de Lyon, 2012.
