= Antoinette Fouque =

French psychoanalyst (1936–2014)

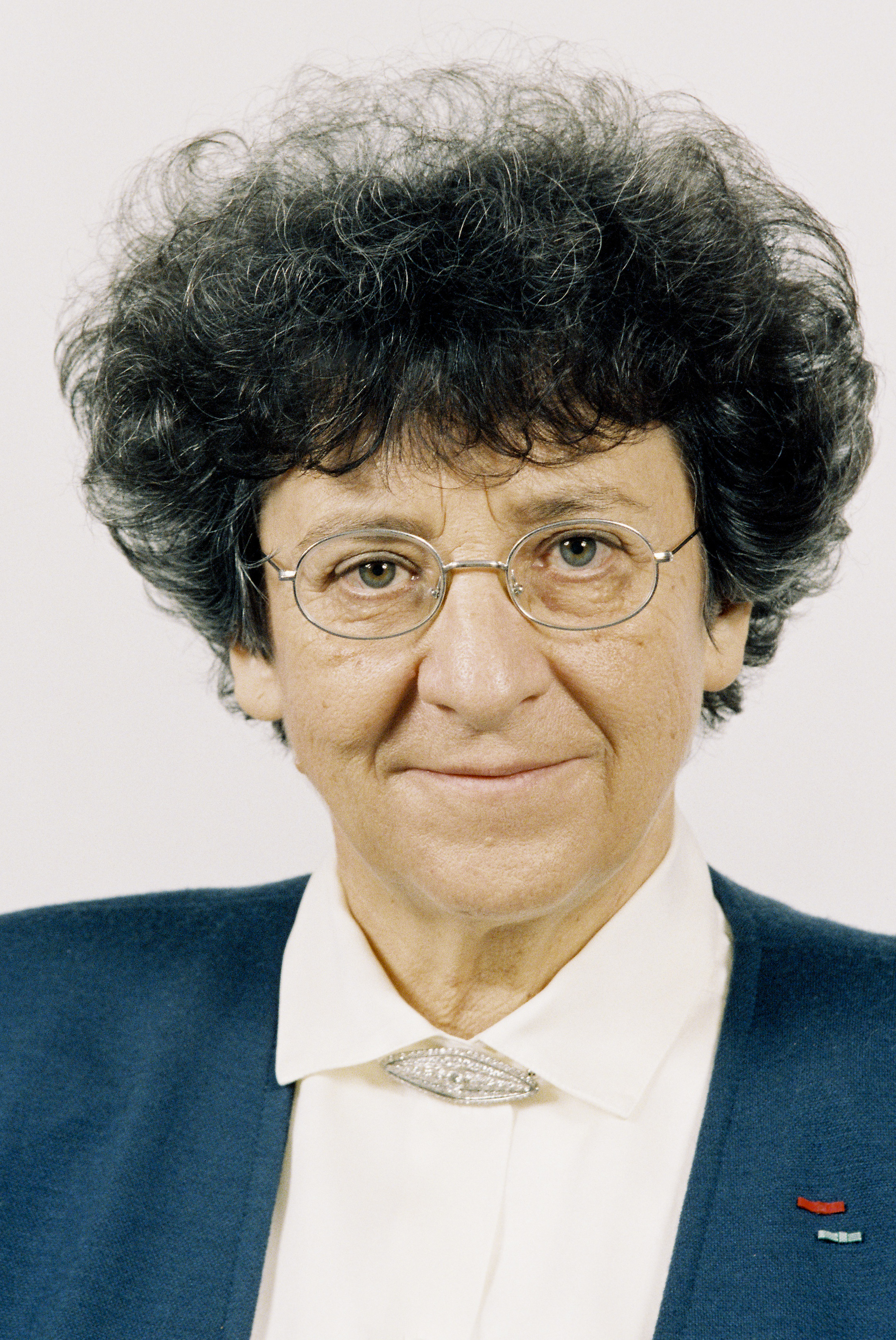
Fouque in 1994

Antoinette Fouque (born Antoinette Grugnardi; 1 October 1936 – 20 February 2014) was a French psychoanalyst who was involved in the French women's liberation movement. She was the leader of one of the groups that originally formed the French Women's Liberation (MLF), and she later registered the trademark MLF specifically under her name. She helped found the publishing house Éditions des Femmes (Women's Editions) as well as the first collection of audio-books in France, Bibliothèque des voix (Library of voices). Her position in feminist theory was primarily essentialist, and heavily based in psychoanalysis. She helped author Le Dictionnaire universel des créatrices (2013), a biographical dictionary about creative women.

== Life ==
Antoinette Fouque was born in a poor neighbourhood of Marseille to Alexis Grugnardi, a Corsican syndicalist. Her mother, of Italian origin, emigrated from Calabria to France for economic reasons and settled in a popular district of Marseille. Early in life, Fouque listened to the speeches of communist leader Maurice Thorez.

She became a teacher, married René Fouque, and developed an interest in Latin culture and Italian literature. With René Fouque, Antoinette Fouque participated in the literary journal Cahiers du Sud. She gave birth to a daughter, Vincente, in 1964. This event helped make her realize the difficulties that women face when they are mothers and married, especially in an intellectual environment. Between 1965 and 1969, she read Italian manuscripts for Éditions du Seuil. Fouque read Jacques Lacan before reading Sigmund Freud.

After marrying René Fouque, Antoinette Fouque moved to Paris to study literature at the Sorbonne. In the 1960s, she enrolled at the EPHE for a thesis on literary avant-gardes, which she abandoned preferring her activism alongside women, but passed a "DEA with Roland Barthes". It was during a seminar of Barthes, in January 1968, that she met Monique Wittig. Appalled by the sexism surrounding the intellectual and activist environments at the time of May 1968, Fouque became active with Wittig and Josiane Chanel in one of the early women's groups which gathered together in 1970 to form the mouvement de libération des femmes (MLF), a movement consisting of multiple groups throughout France without any formal leadership. Fouque herself denied being feminist, and rejected Simone de Beauvoir's existentialism in favour of structuralism and libertarian Marxism. Her group was called Psychanalyse et politique (Psych et po). Conflicts developed within the movement between Fouque and Wittig, since the former was influenced by Lacan and the latter by Herbert Marcuse. In April 1971, Antoinette Fouque signed the Manifesto of the 343 for the right of abortion.

In 1974, she helped found "Éditions des femmes", funded by Sylvina Boissonnas, "an heiress of the Schlumberger family", which printed works for the feminist movement. In October 1979, she registered the name MLF as the property of her group, creating controversy. Beauvoir wrote against this appropriation of the MLF by one group.

== Psychoanalytic training and views ==
Fouque practiced as a psychoanalyst starting in 1971, but her credentials were not clearly established. Between 1969 and 1975, Fouque underwent psychoanalysis with Lacan; she said that this helped her "not to yield to the feminist illusion. He made me avoid the idea that a woman can only be a failed man. He allowed me to criticize Sartre and Beauvoir." During that same period, Fouque also underwent psychoanalysis with Luce Irigaray.

In 1974, Fouque met Serge Leclaire and discussed undergoing analysis with him, but the analysis did not take place. Leclaire became a friend of Fouque, and worked with Psych et po. He believed that Psych et po had revived the psychoanalytic movement by introducing "the body and otherness". In 1977, Leclaire proposed to Lacan to hold a seminar within the framework of the Freudian School of Paris with Fouque, but Lacan refused.

Between 1978 and 1982, Fouque underwent psychoanalysis with Bela Grunberger. Fouque stated that she found Grunberger misogynistic.

Fouque proposed the existence of a specifically feminine libido "located at a post-phallic genital stage", of oral-genital type: a "uterine libido" or "female libido". She believed that, at the root of misogyny, there is the primordial envy of the procreative capacity of women, which she calls "the envy of the uterus", more powerful than the "penis envy" conceptualized by Freud about girls. According to the psychoanalyst Martine Ménès, Lacan was interested in the debates of the MLF but rejected Fouque's notion of libido.

Fouque also opposed the idea that women are unfinished men which she considered to be the source of misogyny, inducing "in all fields, the real and symbolic violence inflicted to women". In addition, she maintained that the production of living things was "a fundamental contribution of women to humanity".

== Publishing ==
Reader of the Seuil publishing house, she became herself a publisher by creating Editions des femmes, the first women's publishing house in Europe, in 1972. Her commitments for the liberation of women led her to carry out numerous activities in the field of publishing. Considering that the French intellectual environment is very macho and that women are underrepresented, especially among writers, and considering women as a "people without writing", she works to open the world of books and writing to women.

From the start, this publishing house has a twofold perspective: political commitment and literary commitment. Its aim is to promote literature but also more generally the struggles of women.

Bookstores of the same name open in Paris (1974), Marseille (1976) and Lyon (1977). She creates the first collection of audio books in France "La Bibliothèque des voix" (1980). She is also involved in newspapers, Le Quotidien des femmes (from 1974 to June 1976) and Des femmes en mouvement, a monthly magazine (13 issues from December 1977 to January 1979) and then weekly (from 1979 to 1982).

== Research and organizations ==
She created various organizations such as the Women's Science Research Institute in 1980, the College of Women's Studies in 1978, the Women's Alliance for Democracy (AFD) and the Misogyny Observatory in 1989, as well as the Parity Club 2000 in 1990. The bookshop activities were reborn with an "Espace des femmes" center dedicated to the creations of women, with a gallery and the organization of meetings and debates in Paris.

A doctor of political science, Antoinette Fouque was director of research at Paris 8 University from 1994, and a member of the Observatory of Gender Equality from 2002.

== Political career ==
Antoinette Fouque ran for the European elections of 1994 on the list Énergie radicale (Radical Energy) led by Bernard Tapie.

A radical left-wing member of the European Parliament from 1994 to 1999, she joined the PES Group and sits on the Committees on Foreign Affairs, Civil Liberties and Women's Rights (Vice-President)

In 2007, she called for a vote for Ségolène Royal, in a text published in Le Nouvel Observateur, "against a right wing of arrogance", for "a left of hope".

== Death ==
Antoinette Fouque died on 20 February 2014 in Paris, and right-wing and left-wing politicians paid her homage. On 26 February, she was buried in the cemetery of Montparnasse, in the presence of many people including politicians and performers.

== Honours and awards ==
- Commandeur of the Order of Legion of Honour
- Grand Officier of the Ordre National du Mérite

== Bibliography ==
- Fouque, Antoinette; Didier, Beatrice; Calle-Gruber, Mireille (November 2013). Le Dictionnaire universel des créatrices. France: Éditions des Femmes. ISBN 978-2-7210-0631-8.

== See also ==
- Feminism in France
