= Gouines rouges =

French radical feminist lesbian movement

The Gouines Rouges ("Red Dykes") are a French radical feminist lesbian movement.

The Gouines Rouges were founded in April 1971, out of a wish to assert themselves within both the feminist movement and the homosexual movement, and the fear that lesbians were in danger of disappearing.

== History ==
In April 1971, the Mouvement de libération des femmes (MLF, "Women's Liberation Movement") had existed for two and a half years. Three hundred women who were coming regularly to its general meetings at the École nationale supérieure des Beaux-Arts then launched a campaign for free abortion and birth control.

The Front homosexuel d'action révolutionnaire (FHAR, "Homosexual Front for Revolutionary Action"), a radical movement rejecting reforms in favor of homosexuality that they deemed inadequate or timid, had been created a month earlier on the initiative of MLF activists and some members of the homophile organization Arcadie.

The "alliance between the MLF girls and the FHAR gays" seemed so obvious that no one questioned the FHAR's gender-mixing. Members of both movements felt victimized by "phallocracy" and wanted "the free disposition of [their] body. " Anne-Marie Fauret, in issue #12 of the leftist newspaper Tout, sums up this position: "Our place is at the intersection of movements that will free women and homosexuals. The power that we claim is our self-realization."

But the appearance of Tout #12, in which gays and lesbians publicly spoke out in a far-left newspaper for the first time, tipped the balance between the sexes over to the male side. With men flocking to the FHAR, the lesbians felt marginalized, their number remaining substantially the same. Feminist activists felt dispossessed by the FHAR.

Finally, the militant lesbians held a meeting against the FHAR's "misogyny" in the Beaux-Arts auditorium. Some fifty activists, aged between twenty and thirty-five, founded the Gouines rouges. The name was taken from the invective of a hostile passerby during a demonstration.

The movement became known through leafleting at the entrances to women's clubs in the Quartier Pigalle and Chez Moune. In June 1971, a party at Les Halles was organized "to celebrate with joy the beginning of our rebellion, to come out of our ghettos, to finally live our love in broad daylight."

Shortly afterward, the group split off from the FHAR to rejoin the MLF, meeting as an informal discussion group. Concepts such as "becoming lesbian by political choice" were introduced or discussed there. The Gouines rouges asserted themselves within the MLF with "happenings" in the general meetings, with themes like "Are lesbians women?" or "Our problem is yours too," or during the "Days of denunciation of crimes against women," held at the Maison de la Mutualité on 14–15 May 1972. Meetings of the Gouines rouges then became more infrequent, despite the encouragement of Monique Wittig.

== Membership ==
The group included Monique Wittig, Christine Delphy, Marie-Jo Bonnet, Dominique Poggi, Catherine Deudon, Évelyne Rochedereux, Cathy Bernheim and Josiane Gamblain.

== Bibliography ==
- Marie-Jo Bonnet, «Les Gouines rouges», Ex-Aequo #11, October 1997.
- Marie-Jo Bonnet, Les Deux amies, Éditions Blanche, 2000.
