= Anne Commire =

American playwright and editor (1939–2012)

- Born: August 11, 1939; Wyandotte, Michigan, U.S.
- Died: February 23, 2012 (aged 72)
- Education: Eastern Michigan University
- Occupations: Playwright, editor
- Writing career
- Notable awards: Dartmouth Medal (2001)

Anne Commire (August 11, 1939 – February 23, 2012) was an American playwright and editor who frequently wrote about women's issues and struggles. Her first play, Shay, about a young pregnant high school dropout, was noted by The New York Times for having "sharp comic dialogue" despite the weighty subject matter.

== Life and career ==
Commire received the Eugene O'Neill Theater Award four times between 1973 and 1988. She wrote the teleplay Rebel for God for CBS, and also has written for Dick Cavett, and Washington D.C.'s Spread Eagle Review, and Mariette Hartley’s one-woman show. She and Hartley co-wrote Breaking the Silence, which was Harley's memoir about her difficult early years and how Hartley would no longer be keeping the secrets of her earlier difficult life.

Commire was born in Wyandotte, Michigan, and received a bachelor's degree in 1961 from Eastern Michigan University. She initially worked as a teacher and an editor for reference books for Gale Group. She later edited the 16-volume Women in World History: A Biographical Encyclopedia, which received the Dartmouth Medal for outstanding reference work in 2002.

Commire died of cancer in 2012 and her papers are held by the University of Southern Mississippi.

== Works ==
=== Plays ===
- Shay
- Put Them All Together. Premiered at the Coronet Theatre, 1982.
- The Melody Sisters
- Starting Monday
- The NOW Show

=== Books ===
- (ed.) Yesterday's authors of books for children : facts and pictures about authors and illustrators of books for young people, from early times to 1960, Detroit: Gale Research Co., 1977
- (with Mariette Hartley) Breaking the Silence, 1990
- (ed.) Historic world leaders, Detroit : Gale Research Inc., 1994
- (ed.) Women in World History: A Biographical Encyclopedia, 17 vols., 2000.
- (ed.) Dictionary of Women Worldwide: 25,000 women through the ages, Farmington Hills, MI: Thomson Gale, 3 vols., 2007
- Moorville
