= Governor (Les Invalides, France) =

Gouverneur des Invalides Governor of Les Invalides
- Incumbent; Christophe de Saint-Chamas since 1 August 2017
- Seat: Paris, France
- Nominator: Council of Ministers
- Appointer: President of France
- Term length: 5 years
- Precursor: Governors (until 1792); General Council Administration (1793-1796); Commandants (1796-1803); Governors (1803-1871); Commandants (1871-1941); Governors (1941-present)
- Formation: 1670
- First holder: François Lemaçon d’Ormoy (1670-1678)

The Governor of Les Invalides (French: Gouverneur des Invalides) is a French military personality and figure, named by the French Government (French: Le Gouvernement Français) to direct the institution of the Hôtel des Invalides (French: Hôtel des Invalides) of Paris.

== History ==
Since creation, the Hôtel des Invalides (French: Hôtel des Invalides) was directed by Governors until 1792. A General Administration Council (French: Conseil Général d'Administration) ensured the direction of the institute from 1793 to 1796. Since then, the latter's directorate was exercised successively by Commandants, from 1796 to 1803, Governors from 1803 to 1871, then Commandants from 1871 to 1941, and again by Governors since that date.

== Attributions ==
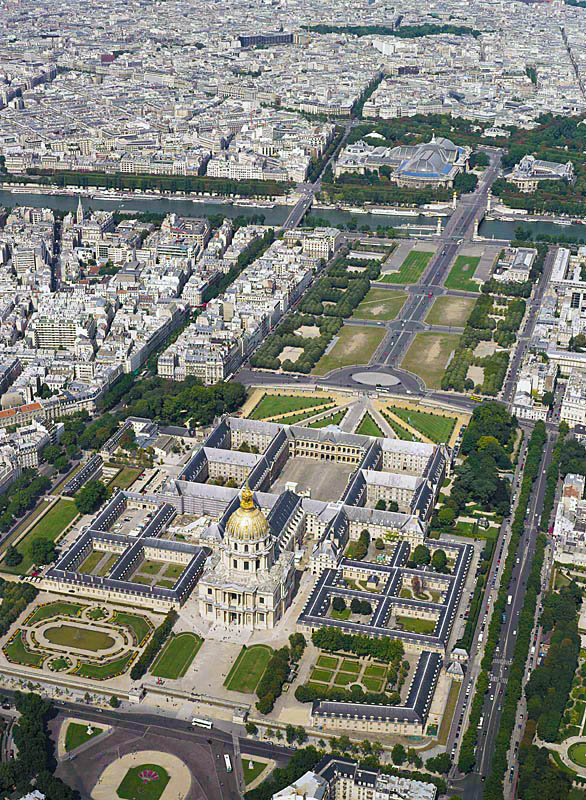
Aerial view of the Hôtel des Invalides.

The function is assured by a général officer nominated for a period of five years by the President of France based on the proposition of the Council of Ministers (French: Conseil des Ministers). These attributions are fixed by a decree of February 25, 1961, modified by another decree of May 6, 1991.

The Governors of Les Invalides is member by rights of Law (French: Membre de Droit) to the administration council of the national Institute of Les Invalides, at the title of the representatives of the State, with the title of Vice-President. « Designated to represent the President of the Republic, titular protector of the Institution, near by the retired veterans and military wounded, hospitalized at the Invalides, he exhausts all his influence so that the concerned veterans, in all sort of, and under any circumstances, are attested for their service and have the recognition of the Nation. ».

He is a member by right of Law of the Musée de l'Armée. He authorizes all the diverse manifestations and official ceremonies that take lieu at the corps of the Hôtel des Invalides (French: Hôtel des Invalides), out of which notably the Cathedral Saint-Louis of Les Invalides (French: Cathédrale Saint-Louis des Invalides). He resides in the Hôtel des Invalides, along with his secretariat. If he dies in office while in official function (French: mort en function) tenure, he could be buried in the Governors Vaults.

Since August 1, 2017, the Governor of Les Invalides is Army corps general Christophe de Saint-Chamas, who succeeded to général d'armée Bertrand Ract-Madoux, resigning from the date of May 12, 2017.

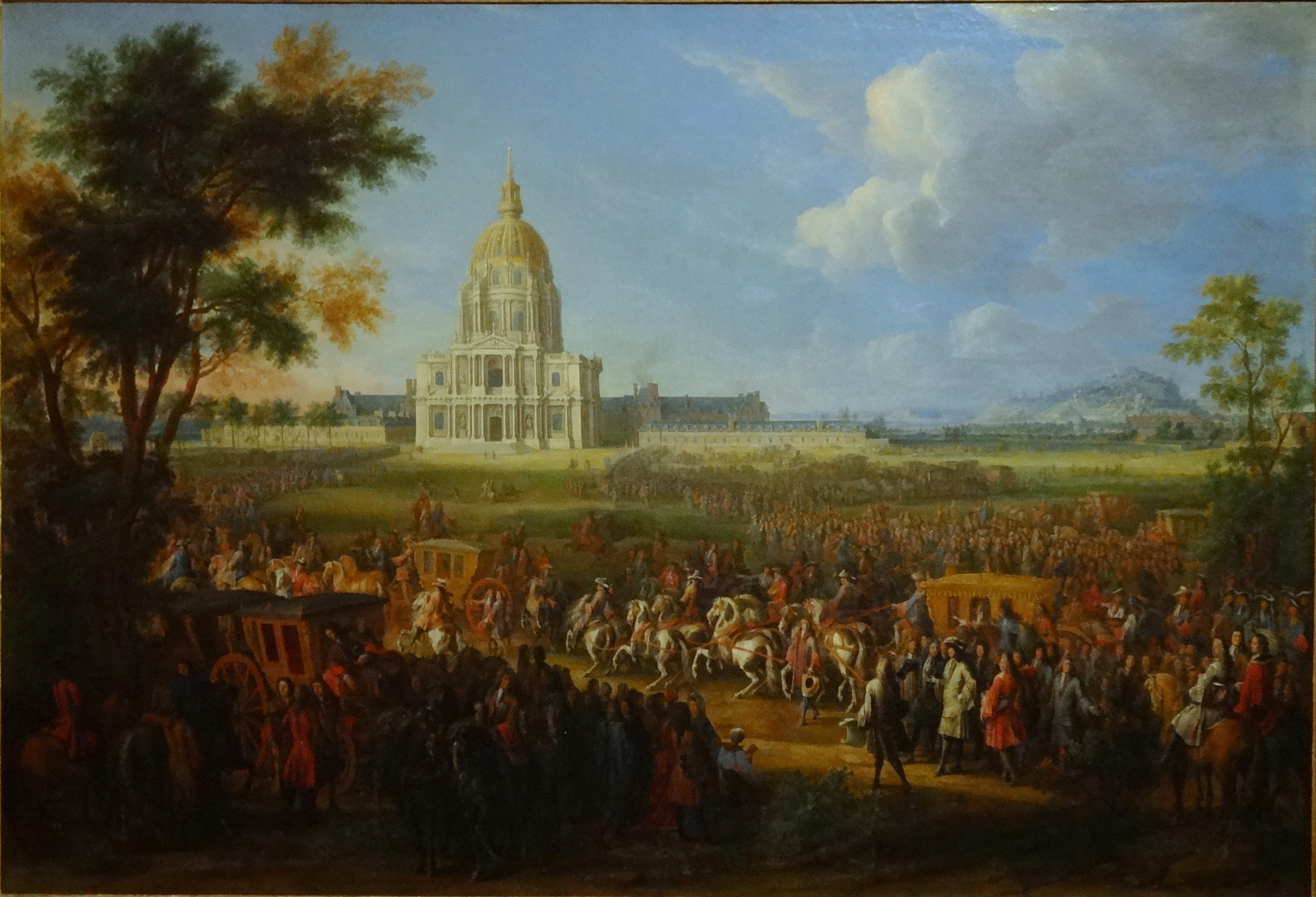
Hôtel Royal des Invalides visited by Louis XIV.

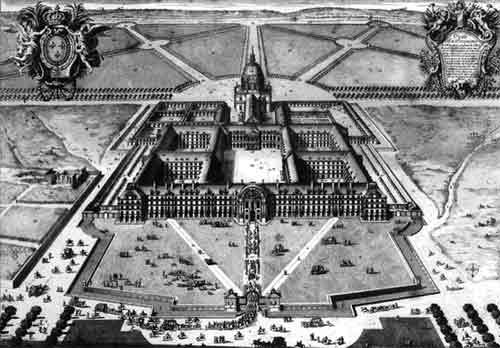
Les Invalides in 1683 under Louis XIV.

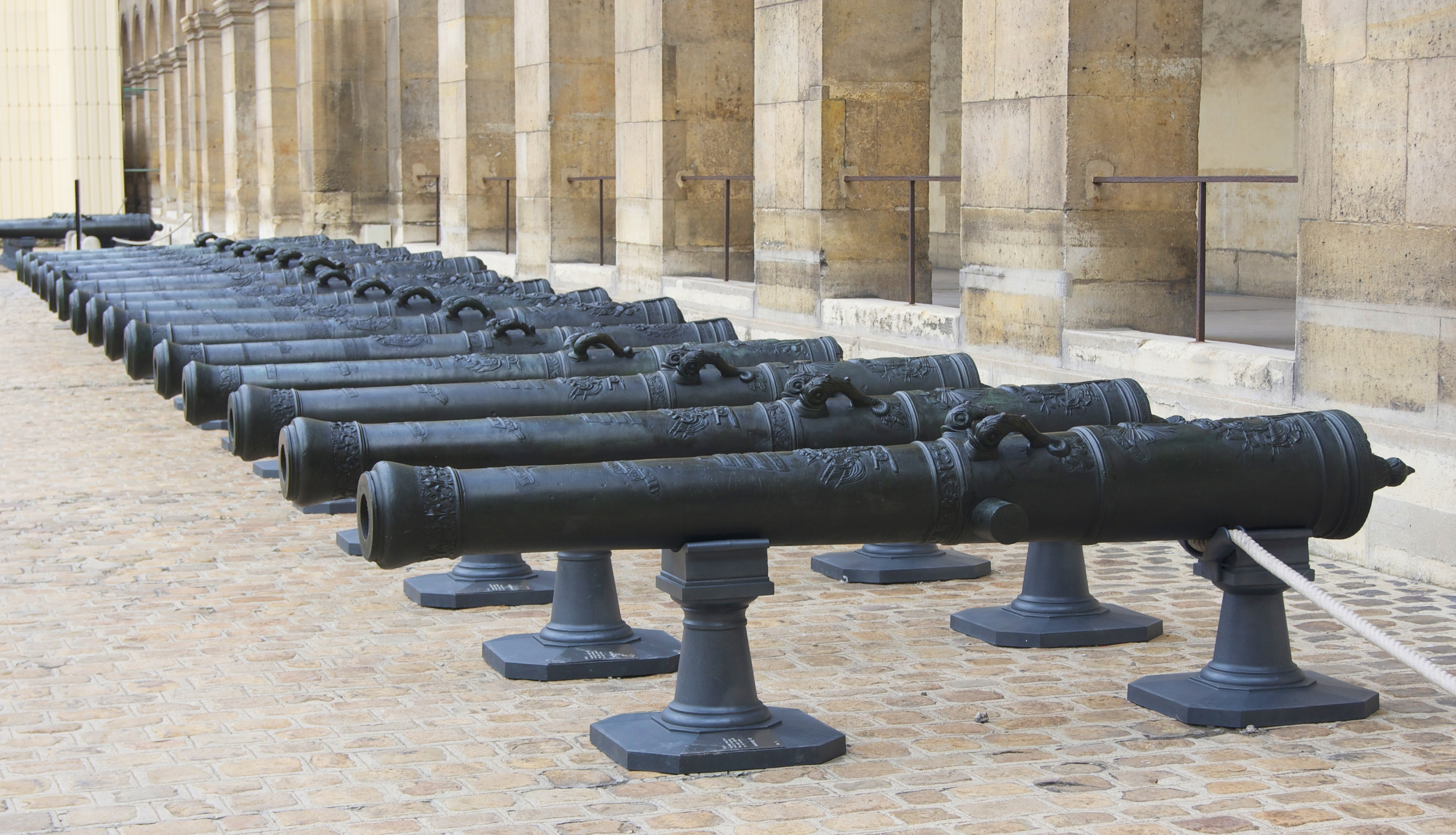
A series of bronze Canon de 12, époque of Louis XV, Honorary Courtyard (French: Cour d'Honneur) of Les Invalides.
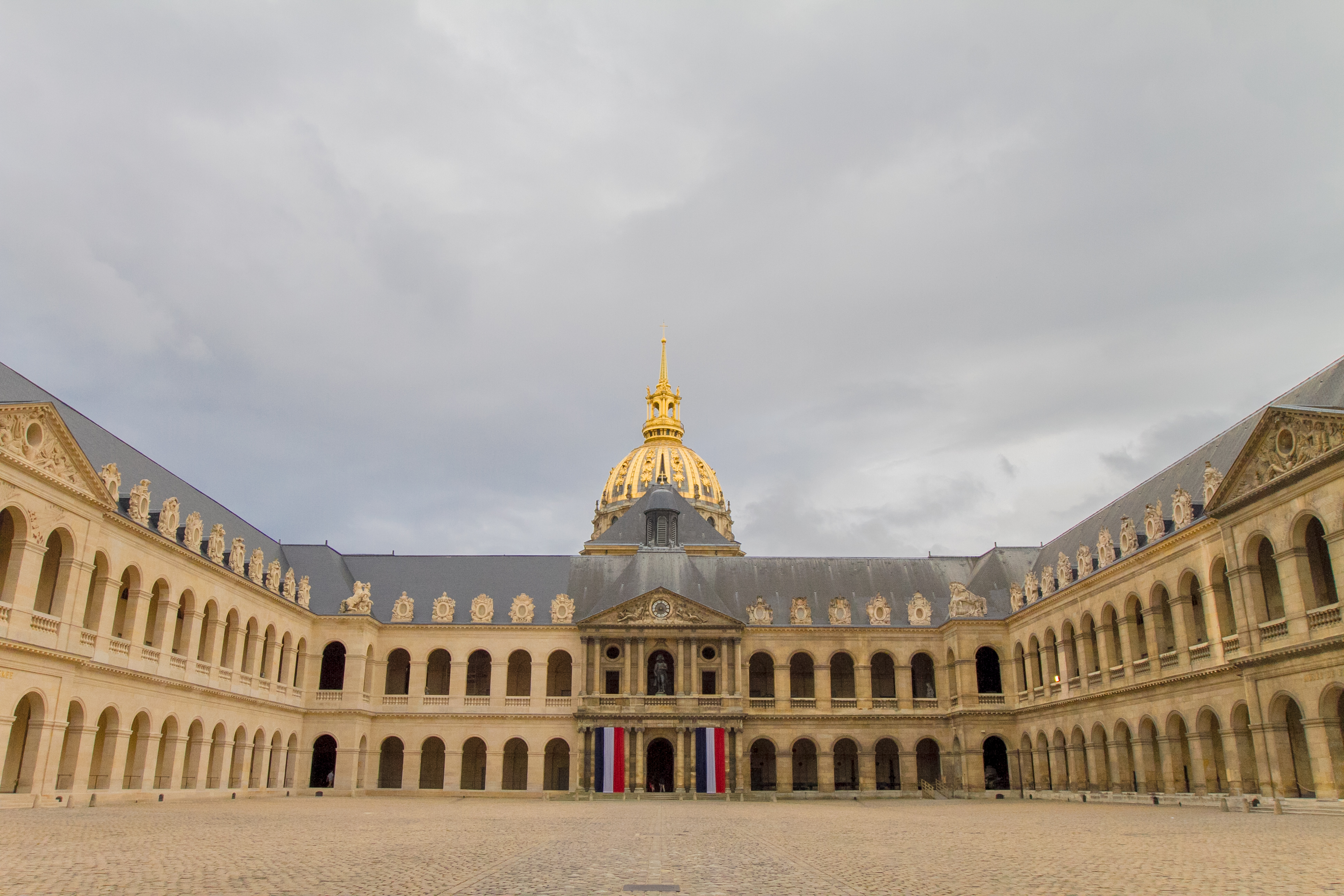
Honorary Courtyard (French: Cour d'Honneur) with National colors.

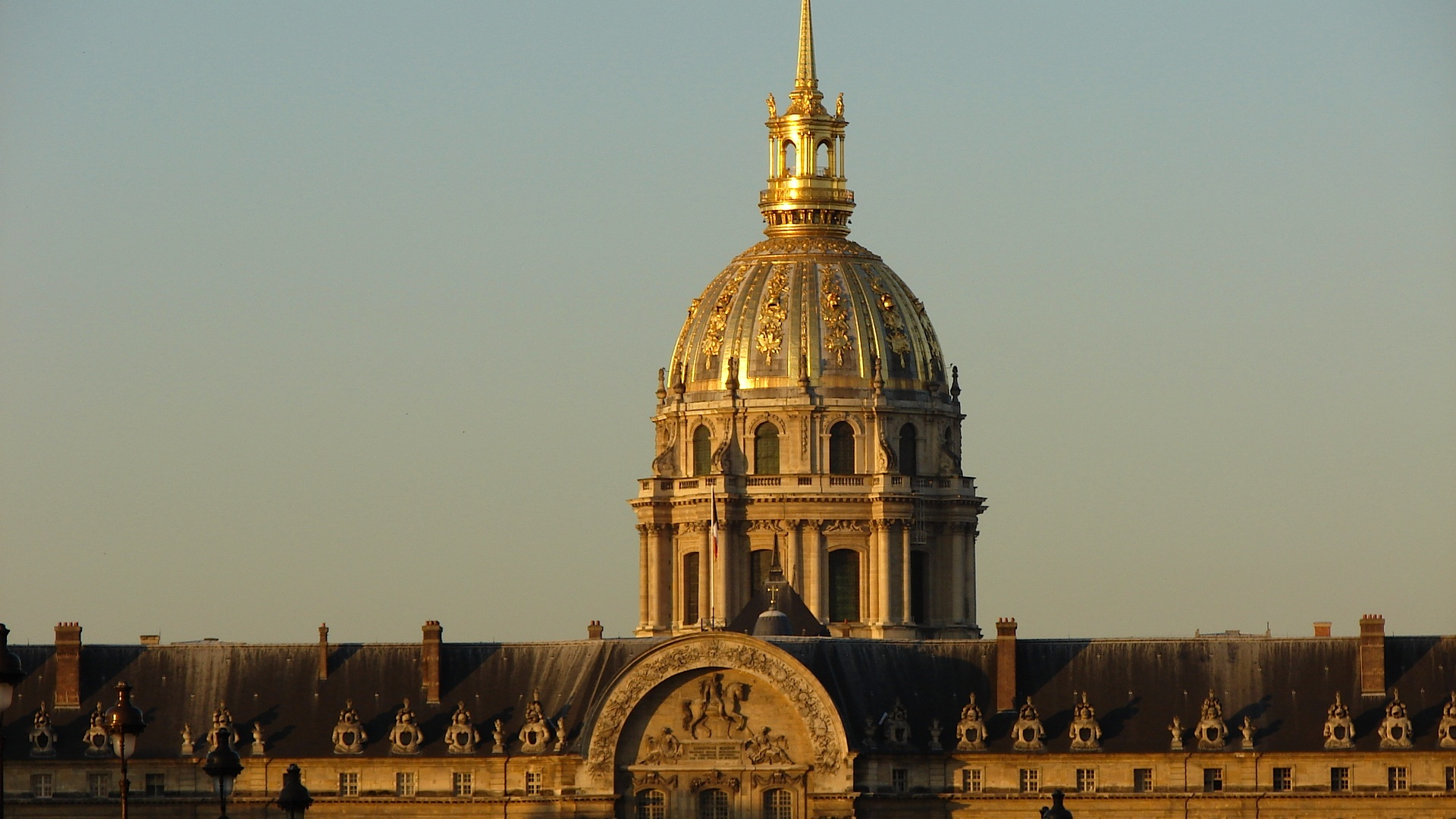
Dôme of the Hôtel des Invalides.

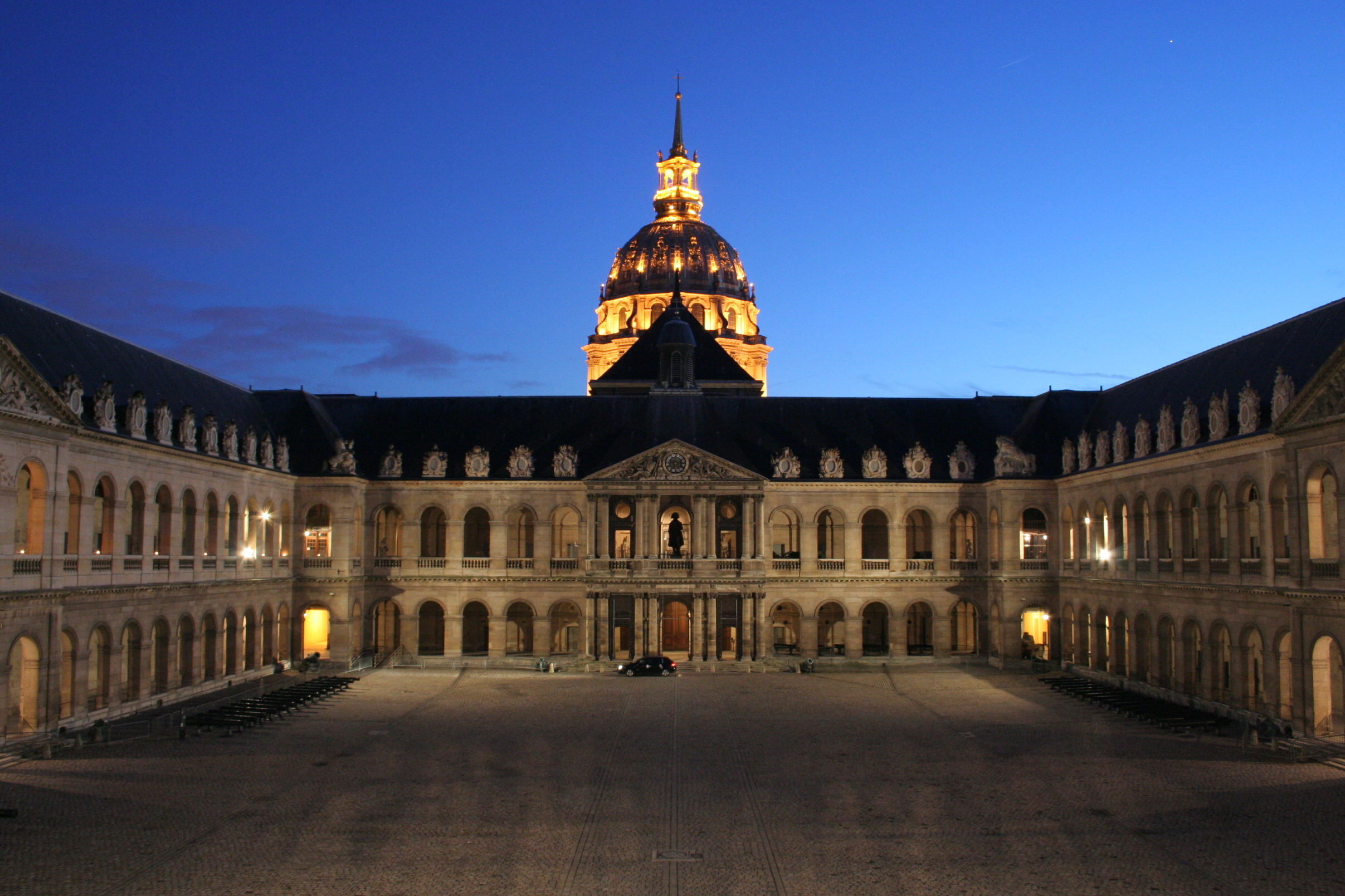
Honorary Courtyard by night animated since 2011 by the spectacle « Night at Les Invalides (French: la Nuit aux Invalides) ».

== Governors and Commandants of Les Invalides since 1670 ==
- 1670–1678: François Lemaçon d'Ormoy (1...–1677)
- 1678–1696: Chevalier André Blanchard de Saint-Martin (1613–1696)
- 1696–1705: Nicolas d'Orange (1626–1705)
- 1705–1728: Alexandre de Boyveau (1646–1727), Maréchal de camp
- 1728–1730: Eugène de Beaulieu
- 1730–1738: Pierre de Vissec (1652–1737)
- 1738–1742: Joseph de Mornay (1670–1742), designated simultaneously as Marnais de la Bastie, Knight of Saint-André
- 1742–1753: Jean-Marie Cornier de la Courneuve (1670–1753)
- 1753–1766: General François d'Azemard (1695–1766)
- 1766–1783: Lieutenant-General Jean Joseph Sahuguet d’Espagnac (1713–1783)
- 1783–1786: Lieutenant-General Charles Benoît de Guibert (1715–1786)
- 1786–1792: Charles-François Virot, Marquis de Sombreuil (1727–1794)
- 1793–1796: General Council Administration
- 1796–1796: General Arnaud Baville (1757–1813), Commandant
- 1796–1797: General Louis-Adrien Brice de Montigny, Commandant
- 1797–1804: General Jean-François Berruyer (1738–1804), Commandant then designated as Governor on August 28, 1803
- 1804–1815: Marshal Jean Mathieu Philibert Sérurier (1742–1819)
- 1816–1821: Marshal François Henri de Franquetot (1737–1821)
- 1821–1822: Marshal Louis-Antoine de Lignaud (1755–1832), interim Governor of the Royal Hotel of Les Invalides from May 19, 1821, until January 1, 1822
- 1822–1830: General Victor de Faÿ (1768–1850)
- 1830–1833: Marshal Jean-Baptiste Jourdan (1762–1833)
- 1833–1842: Marshal Bon Adrien Jeannot de Moncey, Duke of Cornegliano (1754–1842)
- 1842–1847: Marshal Nicolas Charles Oudinot, Duke of Reggio (1767–1847), died in office while in official function tenure at the age 80
- 1847–1848: Marshal of France Gabriel Jean Joseph Molitor (1770–1849)
- 1848–1852: Prince Jérôme Napoléon (1784–1860)
- 1852–1853: Divisional general Jean-Toussaint Arrighi de Casanova (1778–1853), died in office while in official function tenure at age 75
- 1853–1863: Marshal of France Philippe Antoine d'Ornano (1784–1863), died in office while in official function tenure at age 79
- 1863–1870: Divisional general Anatole de La Wœstine (1786–1870), senator of the Second French Empire (French: Sénateur du Second Empire); died in office while in official function tenure at age 84
- 1870–1871: Divisional general Edmond-Charles de Martimprey (1808–1883), Senator of the Second French Empire
- 1871–1891: General Louis Sumpt (1816–1891), Commandant
- 1891–1902: Brigadier general Paul-Édouard Arnoux (1822–1902), Commandant
- 1902–1919: Divisional general Gustave Léon Niox (1840–1921), Commandant
- 1919–1923: Brigadier general Gabriel Malleterre (1858–1923), Commandant, died in office while in official function tenure at age 65
- 1924–1944: Brigadier general Augustin Eugène Mariaux (1864–1944), Commandant then Governor in 1941, died in office while in official function tenure at age 80
- 1944–1944: Brigadier general Guy Pinon (1888–1947)
- 1944–1951: Divisional general Antoine Rodes (1870–1951), died in office while in official function tenure at age 81
- 1951–1960: Army air general Jean Houdémon (1885–1960), died in office while in official function tenure at age 75
- 1961–1962: Divisional general André Kientz (1896–1962), died in office while in official function tenure at age 66
- 1962–1964: Army corps general Raoul Magrin-Vernerey (1892–1964), died in office while in official function tenure at age 72
- 1 September 1964 – 30 March 1973: Brigadier general Jacques de Grancey (1893–1973), died in office while in official function tenure at age 80
- 15 July 1973 – 14 July 1991: Army general Gabriel de Galbert (1912–2001)
- 15 July 1991 – 31 December 1996: Army general Maurice Schmitt (1930–)
- 1 January 1997 – 30 June 2002: Army general Bertrand de Lapresle (1937–)
- 1 July 2002 – 30 June 2009: Army general Hervé Gobilliard (1941–)
- 1 July 2009 – 31 August 2014: Army general Bruno Cuche (1947–)
- 19 September 2014 – 22 May 2017: Army general Bertrand Ract-Madoux (1953–)
- Since 1 August 2017: Army corps general Christophe de Saint-Chamas (1959–)

== See also ==
- Military governor of Paris
- Lieutenant-General (France)
- Marshal of France
- Army Museum (Paris)
