= Lucette Finas =

French author and essayist

Lucette Finas (born 13 July 1921) is a French author and essayist, part of the structuralist movement. She has published several articles relating interviews with French scholars and philosophers in the 1970s, like writers Nathalie Sarraute, philosopher and historian Michel Foucault or philosopher Jacques Derrida. In 1978, she was appointed an officer of the Ordre des Palmes académiques.

== Biography ==
She grew up in Grenoble in a working-class family, her father was a railway worker and her mother a glove maker, in the working-class neighborhood of Place Saint-Bruno. Noticed by her teachers for her excellent academic results, thanks to the solid and strict education provided by her neighborhood elementary school, she had the opportunity to study at high school after elementary school, which was the only option available to children of working-class parents at the time. She went on to pursue higher education and university studies. She came second in the women's agrégation in literature in 1947, after devoting herself to Greek and Latin, which she believed would forever be forbidden to her. She moved to Paris in 1950.

Shortly after May 1968, Lucette Finas became a professor at Paris 8 University, where she remained until 1988. In 1977, she defended her doctoral thesis, entitled L'Acharnement comme principe et mode de lecture (Persistence as a principle and mode of reading). She is known as a specialist in Georges Bataille, Stéphane Mallarmé, and Jacques Derrida, among others. She contributes to a number of literary journals, in particular La Quinzaine littéraire.

A woman of letters, she worked and exchanged ideas with Hélène Cixous,Jacques Derrida,Roland Barthes, Edmond Jabès, Nathalie Sarraute, Raymond Jean, Claude Mouchard, Pierre Pachet, Michèle Manceaux, and many others.
