= Cathy Bernheim =

French feminist activist (1946–2025)

- Born: 10 April 1946; Saint-Raphaël, France
- Died: 8 April 2025 (aged 78); Paris, France
- Education: University of Nice Sophia-Antipolis
- Occupation: Writer • Activist

Cathy Bernheim (10 April 1946 – 8 April 2025) was a French novelist and an influential feminist activist. She started off the Mouvement de Libération des Femmes (Women's Liberation Movement or MLF). She was also a member of the Gouines Rouges, a radical feminist lesbian movement. She authored many books about feminism and the fight for reproductive rights, and gender equality, and against sexual violence in France. Cathy Bernheim was later an author, speaker, journalist, editor, and activist who translated several works of English feminist literature. Bernheim used art as a means of activism and participated in two exhibitions by activist Delphine Seyrig. The different perspectives she brought as an author challenged traditional gender roles when discussing feminism in France.

== Background ==
Cathy Bernheim was born on 10 April 1946, in Saint-Raphaël. Bernheim was raised Catholic, the religion of her mother, while her father was a Jewish resistance freedom fighter. She lived in Paris throughout her childhood until her father got sick and the family moved to Le Lavandou. Her parents separated and Cathy Bernheim was raised by her mother from that point on. She began to write poems at the age of fourteen. She was a French novelist and essayist as well as the grand-niece of Professeur Bernheim of the Faculté de Médecine de Nancy. Bernheim attended Université Nice-Sophia-Antipolis (UNS, formerly UNSA) from 1963 to 1966. She moved to Paris and worked at the Lucernaire Theater.

Bernheim died in Paris on 8 April 2025, at the age of 78.

== Career ==
Bernheim, an influential and well-known feminist activist, is considered a pioneer of the Mouvement de Libération des Femmes (Women’s Liberation Movement). Founded in 1970, this movement fought against patriarchy in France, and for women’s rights. The movement was led by nine women, including Bernheim. This movement was also founded around the same time as the American Women's Liberation Movement. The Mouvement de Libération des Femmes fought for bodily autonomy and challenged patriarchal society and all the problems that come with it. This movement led to transformations within the political and social society in France, giving women more rights in regard to birth control and parental equality. She was also a vital member of the Gouines Rouges- “Red Dykes” a French radical feminist lesbian movement. This movement went hand in hand with the Mouvement de Libération des Femmes because the lesbian activists made it their duty to show the feminists that their causes are unified and that they are all working toward the same goal. Therefore, when the Mouvement de Libération des Femmes held gatherings the lesbian activists of the Gouines Rouges would come to make their case heard and fight in unity alongside their feminist peers.

She was a novelist, journalist, artist, and editor. She translated several English feminist works such as biographies of Emma Goldman and Angela Davis. She spoke English, French, and Italian. Between 1967 and 1969, she worked in cinema and wrote films in Paris such as Trop près des Dieux, and La mal-aimée. Later on in her life, she became an editor at Prisma Media, a Spanish media and news organization. She worked there from June 1990 to July 2015.

== Activism ==
Much of Cathy Bernheim’s activism stemmed from her work with the Mouvement de Libération des Femmes, or the MLF. Founded in 1970 alongside the American Women's Liberation Movement, the MLF, led by nine women including Bernheim, Monique Wittig, Christiane Rochefort, Christine Delphy, and Namascar Shaktini, fought for women's rights and challenged patriarchy. Bernheim spearheaded the movement’s first protest by laying a wreath under the Arc de Triomphe on 26 August 1970, which marked the 50th anniversary of women obtaining the right to vote in the United States. Her words, "There is more unknown than the unknown soldier: his wife," were displayed on banners during the demonstration, which was the first monumental act of the movement. Its purpose was to put flowers on the tomb of the widow of the unknown soldier. Their argument was that, while the unknown soldier is respected for doing what was expected of him through heroic military service, the woman of the household had been working in this selfless position for centuries. Through domestic work, the MLF argued that women had been sacrificing themselves for the lives of others, asking why they were not recognized for that sacrifice.

In an interview with France 2 TV, Bernheim stated, "We told ourselves we really had to strike a blow." The famous monument was a good place to try and get the message across that 'one out of two men… is a woman.'" In the news interview she spoke about the revolutionary characteristics of their movement and how it was unlike any other that France had seen, so much so that the police officers observing their protest were baffled. Bernheim's, along with the eight other women's, protest began at the Champs-Elysées and ended at the police station, where they were later arrested as a result of the protest. She said, "It was so unlike any other form of serious political action. That’s why it had such an impact on people… It was so unexpected for women to assert themselves simply as women, that journalists and police didn’t understand a thing." The MLF used this protest to gain media attention as a way of pushing their movement through French media. Through news interviews, like Bernheim's, and arrests, it was a way for the MLF to spread their feminist cause and to recruit members for the movement.

Bernheim focused on issues ranging from sexual assault, domestic and political equality, and a rejection of misogynistic beauty standards, to the fight for reproductive justice for women. She advocated for the teenage girls at Château de la Solitude, an institution for young single mothers, and supported these girls in a hunger strike. Many, pregnant due to sexual assault, were pulled out of school and placed in institutions Bernheim likened to prisons. The support lent by Bernheim, along with other French activists such as Simone de Beauvoir, led to the closure of the Château de la Solitude in 1976. Inspired by her campaign work with the MLF regarding this cause in 1971, the Veil Law decriminalizing abortion was instituted a year later in 1972. Two years later, in 1974, the contraceptive pill became widely available and was reimbursed by the state.

Bernheim’s feminist work also took on a Marxist perspective, specifically regarding her work with the MLF and their participation in the Wages for Housework campaign. The MLF argued that unpaid housework was a form of slavery and submission. With messages like, "Workers of the world, who is washing your socks?", the MLF fought for the principle of gender pay equality and paid housework.

Bernheim also used art as a means of activism. She participated in two exhibitions spearheaded by activist Delphine Seyrig, a Lebanese-French actress and film director, at the Museo Reina Sofia in Madrid, the Württembergischer Kunstverein in Stuttgart, and the Centre audiovisuel Simone de Beauvoir in Paris. Bernheim was one of 36 artists who contributed to the exhibitions, which were shown from 2019 to 2023. The exhibitions were titled, "Defiant Muses," and "Defiant Muses: Delphine Seyrig and The Feminist Collectives of 1970s and 1980s France," and were meant to convey a history of feminism through film and photography. It focused on a criticism of sexism in the movie industry and how women have the ability to be successful in their struggle for self-determination within politics.

== Literary legacy ==
Perturbation, My Soeur by Cathy Bernheim delves into the complexities of familial relationships, focusing on the bond between two sisters. The novel tracks two 20th-century French sisters, exploring their differing personalities, experiences, and emotional dynamics. Perturbation, My Soeur contributes to French feminism by exploring female experiences, autonomy, identity, and societal pressures within a patriarchal framework. It also navigates sexuality and intimacy, including elements of lesbian desires or relationships that challenged societal norms in the sisters' lives.

Bernheim's novel and other literary work are deemed significant contributions to the French feminist literary canon. Cathy Bernheim was a very influential figure in the French feminism movement, fighting for gender equality, reproductive rights, and against sexual violence. In an interview on lesbian liberation and desire, author Renate Stendhal explains that she

had been looking for years for a book that would recapture that first discovery of women’s condition as the "second sex" (Beauvoir) and as "colonized people" (as French feminists put it). That awakening to everything: a new world vision, a new language, desire and agency, in short, that golden age of women in the late 60s and 70s to the mid-80s. I found only one book that remembered, step-by-step, women’s new thinking and it was a French book: Cathy Bernheim’s Perturbation, My Soeur.

== Books ==
- Le livre de l'oppression des femmes: (Translation): The Book of the Oppression of Women, Paris, Belfond, 1972
- Les femmes s'entêtent: (Translation): Women are Stubborn, Paris, Gallimard, 1975
- Le sexisme ordinaire: (Translation): Ordinary Sexism, Paris, Le Seuil, 1979
- Perturbation ma sœur. Naissance d'un mouvement: (Translation): Disturbance My Sister. Birth of a Movement 1970-1972, Paris, Le Seuil, 1983
- L'amour presque parfait: (Translation): Almost Perfect Love Paris, edition of the Félin, 1991
- L'amour presque parfait: (Translation): Almost Perfect Love Paris, Le Félin, 2003
- Dors, ange amer: (Translation): Sleep, Bitter Angel Paris, Seuil, 2005
- Perturbation ma sœur:naissance d'un mouvement de femmes (Translation): Disturbance My Sister. Birth of a Movement 1970-1972, Paris, Le Félin, 2010

== Citations ==
1. France, News In (13 August 2022). "The cheerful activism of Les Gouines Rouges -". newsinfrance.com. Archived from the original on 22 March 2024.
2. "Cathy BERNHEIM - Dictionnaire créatrices". www.dictionnaire-creatrices.com.
3. Bard, Christine (2017). Dictionnaire des féministes: France, XVIIIe-XXIe siècle. Paris: PUF. ISBN 978-2-13-078720-4.
4. Mort de Cathy Bernheim, pionnière du Mouvement de libération des femmes (MLF) (in French)
5. "France's women's liberation movement turns 50". inkl. 26 August 2020.
6. Ackerl, Denise (1 April 2023). "Defiant Muses: Delphine Seyrig and the Feminist Video Collectives of 1970s and 1980s France, curated by Nataša Petrešin-Bachelez and Giovanna Zapperi". Moving Image Review & Art Journal. 12 (1): 140–147. doi:10.1386/miraj_00112_5. ISSN 2045-6298. S2CID 265238472.
7. "French Feminist Cathy Bernheim Investigates a Hypnotic Ancestor". The Forward. 15 August 2011.
8. "France's women's liberation movement turns 50". RFI. 26 August 2020.
9. Fell, Alison S. (2019). 'La femme du soldat inconnu'. pp. 129–140. doi:10.3828/liverpool/9781789620429.003.0009. ISBN 978-1-78962-042-9.
10. "Centre audiovisuel Simone de Beauvoir". Centre Simone de Beauvoir (in French).
11. "Cathy Bernheim". MutualArt.
12. "Defiant Muses - Kunsthalle Wien, Museumsquartier". MutualArt.
13. "Defiant Muses: Delphine Seyrig and The Feminist Video Collectives of 1970s and 1980s France". MutualArt.
14. "Defiant Muses". Kunsthalle Wien.
15. Bernheim, Cathy (2010) [1970-1972]. Perturbation, My Soeur. Paris: Le Félin. ISBN 9782866457365.
16. "Authors Lise Weil and Renate Stendhal on Lesbian Desire and Liberation". Lambda Literary. 4 April 2019.
