= Women in World History =

16-volume reference work of biographies

Women in World History: A Biographical Encyclopedia is a 16-volume reference work of biographies of notable women. It includes biographies of around 10,000 women, and also includes genealogical charts of noble families and some joint entries about multiple women (such as "Astronauts: Women in Space"). The work covers women from all walks of life, including all nationalities, and particularly women whose lives are not well documented in other works.

After nine years of work, the encyclopedia was published in 1999, under the editorship of Anne Commire. There were over 300 contributors. It won the 2001 Dartmouth Medal for outstanding reference works from the American Library Association.

== See also ==
- The Women's History of the World
