= Mireille Calle-Gruber =

French literary critic and academic (1945–2026)

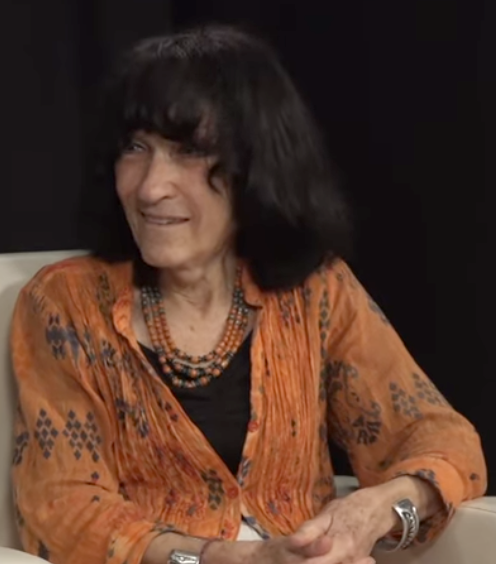
- Calle-Gruber in 2025
- Born: 29 April 1945
- Died: 18 August 2026 (aged 81)
- Occupations: Literary critic Academic

Mireille Calle-Gruber (French: [miʁˈɛj kˈal-ɡʁybˈe]; 29 April 1945 – 18 August 2026) was a French literary critic and academic.

A longtime professor at Sorbonne Nouvelle University, she led series of literary critique such as Cahiers Butor and created digital manuscripts of works by Claude Simon.

Calle-Gruber died on 18 August, at the age of 81.

== Publications ==
=== Novels ===
- Arabesque (1985)
- La Division de l'intérieur (1996)
- Midis. Scènes aux bords de l'oubli (2000)
- Tombeau d'Akhnaton (2006)
- Consolation (2010)
- Le Chevalier morose (2017)
- Tombeau d’Akhnaton (2019)

=== Studies ===
- Itinerari di scrittura (1982)
- L'Effet-fiction. De l'illusion romanesque (1989)
- Les Métamorphoses-Butor. Entretiens (1991)
- Photos de racines (1994)
- La Ville dans L'Emploi du temps de Michel Butor (1995)
- Les Partitions de Claude Ollier (1996)
- Histoire de la littérature française au XXe siècle ou Les Repentirs de la littérature (2000)
- Assia Djebar, la résistance de l'écriture (2001)
- Du Café à l’Éternité. Hélène Cixous à l’œuvre (2002)
- Le Grand Temps. Essai sur Claude Simon (2004)
- Hélène Cixous (2005)
- Assia Djebar (2006)
- Les Triptyques de Claude Simon ou l'art du montage (2008)
- Jacques Derrida, la distance généreuse (2009)
- Claude Simon, L'inlassable réancrage du vécu (2010)
- Claude Simon. Une vie à écrire (2011)
- Marguerite Duras, la noblesse de la banalité (2014)
- Claude Simon, la mémoire du roman. Lettres de son passé (1914-1916) (2014)
- Pascal Quignard ou Les leçons de ténèbres de la littérature (2019)
- Les Comptes du temps. L’Archive Claude Simon. Carnets de Tante Mie (2020)
- Sur le geste de l’abandon (2020)
- Claude Simon, de l’image à l’écriture (2021)
- Claude Simon, être peintre (2021)
- Réinventer les alphabets. Claude Simon, Gastone Novelli (2023)
- Marguerite Duras, la noblesse de la banalité (2024)
