= Women's liberation movement in Europe =

20th-century feminist movement

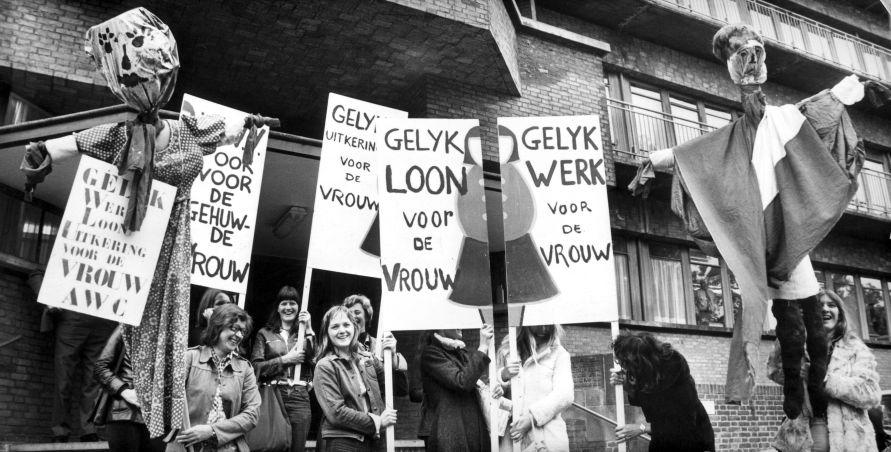
Women demonstrate in front of the Hague for equal pay on 29 May 1975.

The women's liberation movement in Europe was a radical feminist movement that started in the late 1960s and continued through the 1970s and in some cases into the early 1980s. Inspired by developments in North America and triggered by the growing presence of women in the labour market, the movement soon gained momentum in Britain and the Scandinavian countries. In addition to improvements in working conditions and equal pay, liberationists fought for complete autonomy for women's bodies including their right to make their own decisions regarding contraception and abortion, and more independence in sexuality.

Groups which formed typically rejected hierarchical structure and operated on the basis of membership consensus, rejecting the idea that leadership conferred any expert status, and instead was simply another experience. They believed direct actions, which informed the public on the issues women faced, were more productive in changing thoughts than reforming laws. Their aims were to redesign society by changing the perception of women and their roles in society.

Though European liberationists were more aligned with socialist movements than liberationists in the groups which formed elsewhere, women in the WLM typically viewed class-based struggle as secondary to addressing patriarchy. Liberationists were resistant to any political system which ignored women entirely or relegated their issues to the sidelines. As groups operated autonomously without centralized organization, there was a fluidity in issues they addressed, but almost all members in the movement felt that unfettered access to education, jobs and child care were primary issues. Bringing issues to the public, which up to the time had been considered private matters, such as division of household labor, lesbianism, objectification of women, and sexual violence, was controversial and met with backlash from the media and public who labeled liberationists as man-haters.

There were robust liberationist movements in almost all Western European countries, though Greece, Portugal and Spain were late to form movements, as they emerged from dictatorship in the era. By the middle of the 1970s or early 1980s, as compromises were made by liberal reformers and governments on major target issues, most liberationist groups had disbanded or gone on to work on single focus issues.

== Austria ==
Though Austria was a conservative society, known as one of the most traditional in Western Europe, and has been characterized as having had no protests during the early 1970s when the Women's Liberation Movement was sweeping throughout the world, the characterization belies that women came together and began writing about and analyzing the status of women as second-class citizens from a feminist perspective by the late 1960s. One of the first writers to evaluate women's place in society in the period was Barbara Frischmuth who published Die Klosterschule (The Convent School) in 1968. The autobiographical novel examined the patriarchal structure of the convent school and its training of women to be submissive and passive. That same year, women participated in the student revolts, but were frustrated that they were confined to roles of serving coffee. The Arbeitskreis Emanzipation (Emancipation Working Group) formed with men and women in 1969 to discuss how women's equality could be furthered.

In 1971, a group known as the Arbeitskreis Emanzipation der Frau (Working Group for Women's Emancipation, AKE) was formed by the Social Democratic Party of Austria (German: Sozialdemokratische Partei Österreichs, SPÖ). Their goals were to protest the idealization of mothers and eliminate barriers to contraception and abortion. On Mother's Day, 7 May 1971, 130 activists demonstrated on Vienna's Mariahilfer Straße to call attention to women's inequality and lack of autonomy to make their own life choices. Hosting a conference the following year in Vienna, the AKE brought women from the states of Salzburg, Tyrol, and Vorarlberg to join with Viennese women to strategize on how to create an autonomous women's movement. Their goals were to be free of the influence of political parties, working to mobilize women to fight for their own liberation, including control of their own bodies and economic choices. From this congress, Erica Fischer, Renate Fleißner, Renate Kohlbacher, Eva Kreisky, Mirl Ofner, Bodil Pedersen, Emmy Scholl, and Jane Wegscheider co-founded the Aktion Unabhängiger Frauen (Independent Women's Action, AUF) group, hosting the first group meeting in 1972 to discuss whether men should be allowed to participate in their group.

In December 1972 the AUF joined with women from the Communist Party of Austria (German: Kommunistische Partei Österreichs, KPÖ) and the SPÖ calling for the abolition of section 144 of the criminal code which prohibited abortion. Gertrud Edlinger, Rosemarie Fischer, Irmtraud Goessler and Kreisky formed a committee Aktionskomitee zur Abschaffung des § 144 (Action committee for the abolition of section 144) to plan the protest to force a referendum. Using street theater, Erika Mis dressed as a convict with § 144 emblazoned on her apparel. Other actors posed as a doctor, judge and priest, and at the end of the presentation, Mis chopped the prison cage with an axe. A key characteristic of the AUF was its lack of organizational structure, opposition to hierarchy, and opposition to patriarchy within a classless society. Their aims were not focused on reforming laws, but in changing the way that women were perceived and allowed to participate in society. The movement grew rapidly in the early 1970s, but by the middle of the decade had developed many critics. Among them were the Socialist feminists, who believed that women's issues would be resolved if class inequality was eliminated and liberal reformers, who felt that by adding women's concerns to existing structures and organizations change would come about. By 1976, AUF dissolved and was reorganized as a women's center with a loose umbrella organizational structure to facilitate groups working on various focal issues regarding women.

== Belgium ==
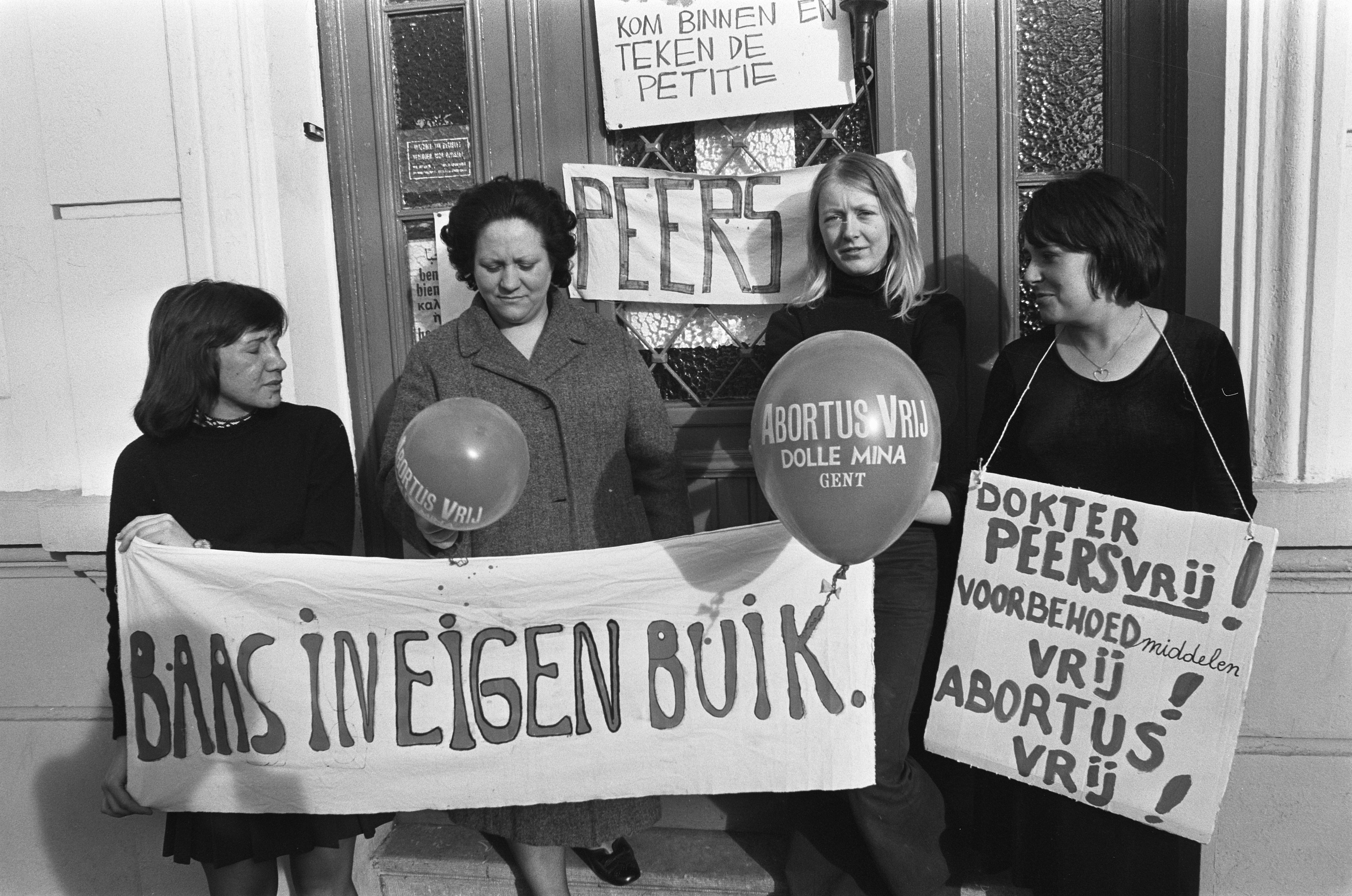
Hunger strike in Ghent in support of abortion rights, January 1973.

Inspired by the student demonstrations in France and the Women's Lib movement in the United States, renewed interest in feminism emerged in Belgium in the late 1960s. Supported by Chantal de Smet and Rose Proesmans, the Flemish extension of the Dutch Dolle Mina (Mad Minas) was effective in influencing public opinion by taking a humorous approach to the cause. In French-speaking Wallonia, a more socially oriented, worker-based movement known as Marie Mineur was founded by Jeanne Vercheval. In Brussels, at the Université libre de Bruxelles, a group known as Le Front de Libération des Femmes gained fame by invading the Miss Belgium event in May 1971, shouting, "Stop the beauty contest, we are not cattle!"

That same year, the journal Et ta sœur? (And your sister?) began publication. The following year, the journal, Le Petit livre rouge des femmes (The Little Red Book of Women) was published as an initiative of Marie Denis. She brought together a wide range of women from various schools of thought on feminism, including liberals, radicals, and socialists, as well as workers and intellectuals to compile their thoughts on their lives. The book became very influential, selling 15,000 copies in a few months. De Nieuwe Maand (The New Month) was another influential journal published in the period, which attempted to bridge the traditional divides between socialists and Catholics in Flanders. It was edited by Rita Mulier.

One of the work groups of De Nieuwe Maand focused on women's issues and in 1971, they hosted a regional symposium in Woumen to discuss the similarities women had regardless of their political and religious beliefs and the lack of response on issues effecting women from official organizations and government. This would become the autonomous group Vrouwen Overleg Komitee (Women's Consultation Committee, VOK), which was predominantly a Flemish organization. On 11 November 1972, Simone de Beauvoir, who had been invited to come to Belgium at the protest held in Paris on International Women's Day that year, came to Brussels to speak at a workshop, which they called Women's Day, organized by women from the Brussels-Capital Region, Flanders, and Wallonia. Based upon the success of that meeting, organizers of the VOK prepared a second Women's Day workshop in Antwerp and soon were hosting meetings throughout the country in various cities.

Out of these various meetings, the focus of the VOK was defined to encourage structural transformation of society, centered on issues such as employment and education. In an effort not to alienate their Catholic members, the organization struggled with its approach to abortion, as they required input and consensus from all women to launch policy directives. For the Dolle Minas and the Marie Mineurs, the main issues were initially free contraception and free abortion. The law forbidding access to contraceptives was withdrawn in 1972. In 1974, women of the VOK, preparing for celebrations of the United Nations' International Women's Year adopted the slogan the "Year of the Unemployed Woman" and focused their efforts on bringing awareness that changes needed were not for a year, but for women's lifetimes. The VOK finally adopted a policy of pro-choice on reproductive rights and while it lost some of its conservative members over the decision, there were affiliated group like the Catholic Vrouw and Maatschappij (Women and Society) which continued to work with the VOK.

In 1975, members of the VOK rallied at the Belgian Parliament's Palace of the Nation protesting the lack of women elected to office. They organized a campaign along with other women's groups to encourage women to vote and to vote for women candidates. By the end of the 1970s, tensions in the various women' groups operating in Belgium grew, as liberals wanted to focus on changing laws and analyzing women's position based on expert opinion. Liberationists, such as the members of the VOK, opposed moving away from the grass-roots nature of women's work and allowing all members to have a voice. By 1985, the cooperation and work of liberationists for women's autonomy, had given way to more formally-established, politically organized women's groups. The VOK though reduced in numbers was able to survive the change and by the 1990s, turned toward preventing the sexual abuse of women and the quality of women's lives. In 1990 liberals triumphed with partial decriminalization of abortion, and liberationists moved away from the issue. Members of the VOK joined the Women in Black movement to protest Yugoslavian war crimes.

== France ==
As early as 1967, women began organizing in France through various political parties and one group, founded by Anne Zelensky and Jacqueline Feldman, who had been part of the Women's Democratic Movement, was the Féminin, Masculin, Avenir (Feminine Masculine Future, FMA), which allowed participation of both female and male activists. Interest in better conditions for women in France progressed in 1968, inspired by the civil unrest in May of that year. During the occupation of the Sorbonne, Feldman and Zelensky participated in events with the FMA, and realized that preference was given to male activists to speak and the women were shut out.

Antoinette Fouque, Monique Wittig and several others organized meetings of women activists from October 1968. The press referred to their activities as mouvement de libération des femmes, or MLF, the French equivalent of the American Women's Liberation Movement. By 1970, the movement began to thrive with demonstrations, including the presentation in August of a wreath at the Tomb of the Unknown Soldier at the Arc de Triomphe in Paris to recognize his "even more unknown" wife. Typically women who joined the MLF were leftist-leaning politically, had little trust in centralized-hierarchical organization, supported provocation of authority, and believed in revolutionary change for society. That same year in April, the FMA became the Féminisme, Marxisme, Action (Feminist Marxist Action) and its male members left, leaving a unisex, all-woman's group. Another liberationist group hosted a demonstration at the Université de Vincennes in May, calling for an end to sexism. The MLF began publishing leaflets by anonymous authors styling themselves as "any woman" or "some activists", to emphasize their belief that no one woman could be the spokesperson for all women. Articles like "Combat pour la libération de la femme" (Combat for the liberation of women) published in L'Idiot International and "Libération des femmes, année 0" (Liberation of Women, year zero) in the magazine Partisans in 1970 became widely read. By September 1970, more than one hundred liberationist groups were meeting regularly around Paris.

Activists aligned with the movement began to meet every two weeks at the École nationale supérieure des Beaux-Arts and by December 1970, had begun publishing the newspaper Le torchon brûle (Waging the Battle). Each issue, though the de facto editor was Marie Dedieu, was produced by a different liberationist group as a means of validating a broad spectrum of ideas. In April 1971, at one of the meetings at the Beaux-Arts, under the guidance of Simone de Beauvoir, the Manifesto of the 343 calling for free access to contraception and abortion was signed by 343 prominent women, which would become one of the main rallying points of the movement. In 1979, after a demonstration preceding the passage of the Veil Law, named after Simone Veil the parliamentarian who pushed through abortion reform, Antoinette Fouque, Marie-Claude Grumbach and Sylvina Boissonnas secretly filed paperwork to form an association and trademarked the name "Mouvement de liberation des femmes – MLF" with the Institute of Industrial and Commercial Property. Activists and publishers immediately protested against the misappropriation of their actions which took a movement, belonging to all, and made it the private property of a few with the ability to legally forbid use of the name.

== Germany ==
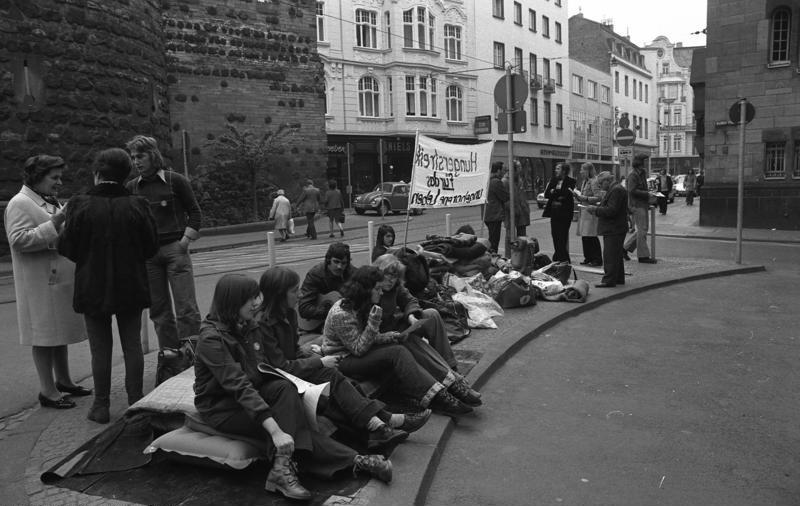
Hunger strike against abortion reforms in Bonn, 22 April 1974.

During the student protests in 1968, in West Germany, women who were part of the Socialist German Student Union (SDS) in West Berlin formed the Aktionsrat zur Befreiung der Frau (Action Council for the Liberation of Women). Their concerns were not only the expectations society placed upon women to confine their role to the family, but also the lack of commitment to women's emancipation by their fellow socialists. Focusing on child care centers, the Aktionsrat members set up anti-authoritarian facilities in Berlin to teach children egalitarian roles. Soon thereafter, on 13 September 1968, at the SDS Federal Congress in Frankfurt, Helke Sander gave a speech articulating the reasons for the founding of Aktionsrat and the need to politicize the issues of women, which were still considered private matters. Her speech was not taken seriously by the men in attendance and angered at their arrogance, Sigrid Rüger threw three tomatoes at the podium, hitting Hans-Jürgen Krahl, one of the leaders of the SDS, in the face. The tomato became a symbol for the women's movement thereafter. Women in Frankfurt founded the Frauen den Weiberrat (Women's Council) soon after the congress and excluded men from their meetings. By November a Frauen den Weiberrat had been established in Hanover.

Women, as elsewhere in the period, formed collectives which held consciousness-raising sessions and offered advice to other women on issues such as health care, discussing things like the dangers of the pill, alternative contraception devices and abortion. One such group was Brot und Rosen (Bread and Roses) a collective formed in Berlin, founded by Helke Sander, when Aktionsrat disbanded in 1969. Similar small groups formed in various parts of the country taking small initiatives, though liberationists were more restrained than elsewhere in Europe. In part, this was because of the movement's apolitical stance, but also in part because consciousness-raising and the maxim "the personal is political" were the antithesis to German leftists. For example, the word used to describe feminist consciousness-raising was Selbsterfahrung (self-experience), which equated to bourgeois, individualistic expression; while the political left used the term Aufklärung (enightenment), which has a serious, political and intellectual connotation.

The cause in West Germany was expanded by the German journalist Alice Schwarzer, who became active in France in 1970, where she had been behind the "Manifesto of the 343" calling for free access to abortion. She managed to convince Wilfried Maaß to have a similar "Manifesto of the 374" published in the Stern. Appearing on 6 June 1971 under the heading Wir haben abgetrieben! (We have had abortions) and signed by prominent figures such as the actress Romy Schneider, it was immediately effective, causing pro-abortion pressure groups to be created throughout the country. The Aktion 218 campaign, a reference to the section of the criminal code which banned abortion, was instigated by students in Munich, Cologne, Frankfurt and West Berlin. A public display on the topic of abortion was at a rally held by various groups in November 1971 in Düsseldorf, where it gained mass support.

Helke Sander and Verena Stefan, among others, living in the collective Brot und Rosen published Frauenhandbuch Nr. 1: Abtreibung und Verhütungsmittel (Women's Guide # 1: Abortion and Contraceptives) in 1971. Within three years, the "yellow" original 30,000 copies had sold out and the second "red" edition was published. Similarly, Stefan's autobiographical novel, Häutungen (Shedding), published in 1975 quickly sold and was in its 5th edition by 1976. Chronicling Stefan's journey to free herself from the indifference and exploitation of women towards a life shared with women and embracing homosexuality, Häutungen became a best seller and inspiration to many in the movement.

In 1971, Homosexual Action West Berlin (HAW) was formed and within a year, eight lesbians had joined the movement opening a women's group within HAW in a commune in Schöneberg. Among the eight members of the group were Ilse Kokula, Monne Kühn, Gisela Necker, Cristina Perincioli, Eva Rieger, Waltraut Siepert, and Christel Wachowski. Some of these women were instrumental in founding the Berlin Women's Center. Placing an advertisement in the alternative journal Hundert Blumen, in November 1972, Perincioli and Siepert attracted around seventy women who were interested in an apolitical group where women could meet, share publications, counsel and interact with other women. Small subgroups formed and women in each group worked on various topics which were of interest to them. Issues concerned a wide berth of topics including: consciousness-raising, publication, sexuality, and women in prison, among others. There was also a group which demonstrated against the law banning abortion, provided counseling, and arranged medical intervention trips to the Netherlands. By 1973, there were active groups working in Bochum, Bonn, Bremen, Cologne, Darmstadt, Düsseldorf, Frankfurt, Giessen, Munich, Nuremberg, and Tübingen on various issues, and networks of support among the various groups and women's centers. A nationwide meeting of liberationist groups took place in Munich in 1973 and in 1974, they met again in Cologne.

In 1974, liberationists organized a women's festival at Technische Universität Berlin. Brot und Rosen organized a large event discussing abortion where various women talked about doctors who provide illegal abortions and filed a complaint against several doctors, though no investigation ever resulted. The Berlin Women's Center organized a public women's party and rejecting male musicians featured women artists like Ina Deter and the Flying Lesbians. The 1974 murder trial of Judy Andersen and Marion Ihns for the murder of Ihns' abusive husband became a rallying point for women, who held protests inside and outside the courthouse in Itzehoe. Bringing domestic violence to the forefront for the first time in Germany, the trial brought recognition of the magnitude of the problem and led to the establishment of the Berlin women's shelter in 1976 and a rape crisis hotline the following year. By 1982, as had happened on an international scale, there was backlash from both society at large and liberal reformist feminists against the liberationists and they became less visible.

== Greece ==
The first women's group autonomous from a political party in Greece formed in 1975 as the Kinisi gia tin Apeleftherosi ton Gynaikon (Movement for the Liberation of Women, KAG), in Athens. Adopting slogans from the Women's Liberation Movement in the United States they believed that personal issues could be politicized. Their first public action in 1976 was to protest the lack of access to contraception. As the country had just emerged from dictatorship and a new constitution was being discussed, members of the movement sought to bring attention to the inequalities faced by women in their families and society. They established a newspaper Gia tin Apeleftherosi ton Gynaikon (For the Liberation of Women) to disseminate their ideas, publishing articles about child care, employment, ideology and sexuality. After four years the group dissolved.

== Ireland ==
In Dublin, a group called the Irish Women's Liberation Movement (IWLM) was founded in 1970 when Máirín de Burca, invited a working-class homemaker Máirín Johnston, journalist Mary Maher, physician Moira Woods, to join her on Monday nights at Margaret Gaj’s café on Baggot Street in Dublin. Inspired by the WLM in the United States, the non-hierarchical structure of the movement and the shock approach to addressing discrimination appealed to the group. Soon after forming, the group published a pamphlet, Chains or Change, outlining their goals, which included equal education, pay and legal rights; removal of the ban against work for married women; fair treatment of deserted wives, unwed mothers and widows; and access to family services such as child care, playgrounds and contraception.

The IWLM appeared on The Late Late Show in 1971 and conducted protests and activism. They led the Contraceptive Train to bring attention to the hypocrisy of the state's ban on contraception, as officials were unable to enforce it. At the time, the only legal contraceptive was the pill, but it could not be prescribed except as a medication to regulate menstrual cycles. Protesting women boarded a train in Dublin and traveled to Belfast to purchase condoms. Upon the return trip, they distributed the contraband condoms to the crowd, flouting the official ban. After a year, the group dissolved, but was widely influential in that short time-period in changing the societal perception of women.

In 1975, the Irish Women United formed as a liberationist group in Dublin. Their first protest actions were to demonstrate against the male-only Forty Foot bathing area at Dublin Bay and the Fitzwilliam Lawn Tennis Club. They also picketed the Miss Ireland beauty pageant and competition, and protested during the trial of Noreen Winchester, who had been imprisoned after killing her sexually abusive father. They hosted consciousness-raising sessions and sought removal of legal barriers and bureaucratic obstacles to an egalitarian society including, divorce equal education and pay, free contraception, and self-determined sexuality. To publicize their goals and issues, they created the journal Banshee and published eight issues before the group dissolved in 1977. Liberationist groups also formed in Cork and Limerick, establishing women's centres and refuges as well as rape crisis centres.

== Italy ==
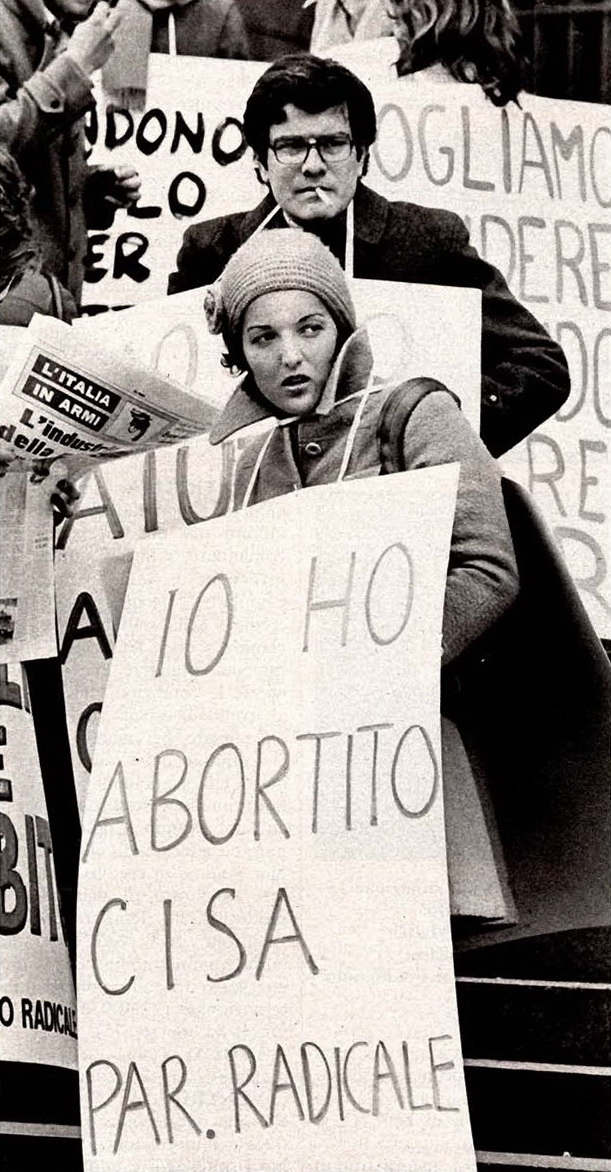
Demonstration for abortion rights in Milan, 1975

In 1967, at the regional congress of the Radical Party held in Bologna, the issues of sexual and psychological freedom were first brought to discussion as political topics. The following year at the national convention of the party in Rome, the discussion broadened to include sexual repression and social oppression, and a motion was approved to focus on these issues. In 1969, the regional congress in Milan adopted similar themes, which led to the creation in the winter of 1969–1970 of the group Movimento di Liberazione della Donna (MLD) (Women's Liberation Movement). The two planks of the organization were to liberate women by affirming their right to be free and control their own bodies, and to create the necessary health structures to legalize abortion. From the beginning the organization had political aims, and constructed a plan of action to decriminalize abortion. By 1975, the organization had split from the Radical Party and become an independent organization fighting for the change to the civil codes dealing with family law.

The goals of the Italian movement were to make women and their issues a political subject, taking the family out of the private sphere; to create new types of organizations and practices, which allowed women to become political actors; and to redefine the methods of engagement with institutions, political parties and other social organizations. In 1969 a women's only collective, Collectivo delle Compagne (Collective of Companions, CDC) formed in Turin, in response to the refusal of male activists to print texts on the liberation movement. Led by Maria Clara Rogozinski and Maria-Teresa Fenoglio, the collective attracted hundreds of members and in 1971 renamed the group, which had become a commune, Colletivo di Via Petrarca, after the street on which it was located. At the meetings of the group, consciousness-raising sessions were held to assist women in removing the boundaries between their personal and public lives and recognizing how private matters could be politicized.

In Rome, a sexual-health movement, which centered on women's reproductive rights, discovering their own body and sexuality, and creating facilities to offer solutions to women developed. Known as the Comitato romano per la liberalizzazione dell’aborto e della contracezzione (Roman committee to liberalize abortion and contraception, CRAC) the group rejected any involvement by either medical professionals or the state in women's complete control of their own bodies, though they did support state run medial facilities offering services to women. In 1970, Rivolta femminile (Feminist Revolt) was founded in Rome by Carla Lonzi, along with Carla Accardi and Elvira Banotti, as a rejection of Marxist theory, declaring that women were not oppressed as a social class, but rather oppressed because of their gender. In Naples, the collective Le Nemesiache, founded by Lina Mangiacapre in 1970, held reenactments of fables and myths as all-women productions, to assist in consciousness-raising, using the arts as a form of protest. Le Nemesiache′s Manifesto proclaimed that women need not integrate into masculine society or strive for legal equality, but should find their own definitions of what being a woman meant. Cerchio spezzato (Broken Circle) was formed in 1970 by students from the University of Trento, as the first group to advocate separatism. Members saw the sexual revolution as a means to objectify women and traditional leftist groups as invalidating women's full participation in society.

In 1972 Il Collettivo di via Cherubini 8 (The Collective at 8 Cherubini Street) formed in Milan, and began publishing the magazine Sottosopra (Upside Down) to disseminate feminist materials from throughout Italy. An important group in Milan, they hosted several international conferences, meeting with liberationists from France and Denmark. While they were willing to allow men to participate in protest, the members believed that only women could define their own sexuality. In 1974 the Gruppo Analis i (Group Analyst I) and the following year the gruppi di Pratica dell'inconscio (Practice Groups of the Unconscious) both formed in Milan for the purpose of analyzing the ties between women. Neither were involved in individual analysis, but rather in evaluating the psychology that was shared by women. On 3 April 1976 when some 50,000 women marched through the streets of Rome, calling for abortion on demand. Liberationists failed in their aims, as under the influence of the Christian Democrats, a compromise solution was reached, giving doctors, rather than women themselves, the necessary decision-making powers, but in practice women were now granted the right to abortion.

The Collettivo Femminista di Santa Croce (Feminist Collective of Santa Croce) which formed in Florence in 1973, participated in a national conference held in their home city in December 1977, known as Donna e follia (Woman and Folly). The two aims of the conference were to explore how women could choose to rebel from the strictures of society on a personal level without being considered insane by the rest of society. Many came away from the meeting with mixed feelings, understanding that through the collectives they had gained support from other women who understood their issues, but by having isolated themselves to find their voice, they had in fact marginalized themselves from the greater society. By the end of the 1970s, the movement became fragmented and activists focus moved toward working on private projects, rather than in the public sphere.

== Netherlands ==
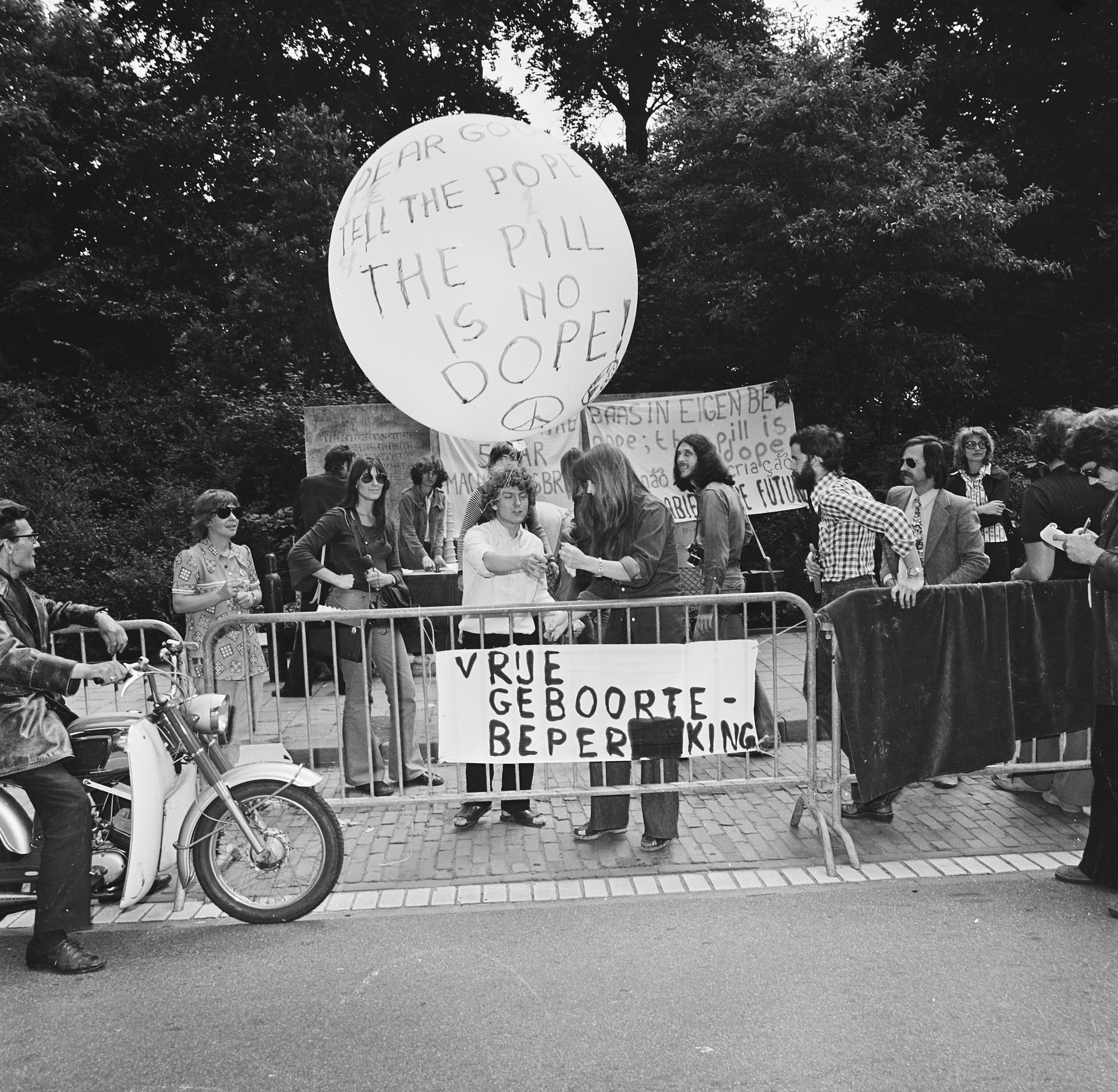
Dolle Mina movement in The Hague in 1973.

The WLM movement in the Netherlands, as elsewhere, was born out of the political climate of the late 1960s, which included the anti-Vietnam, the student movement, and the Dutch Provo Movement, a provocative movement aimed at undermining The Establishment. At the time, there was international discussion on sexuality, sexual liberation, sexual orientation, and the relationship of those to marriage, topics that up to that time had not been considered to be political issues. The concept of patriarchy and a coherent theory about the power relationships between men and women in society did not exist at the time. Joke Kool-Smit wrote an article Het onbehagen bij de vrouw (The Discontent of Women) in 1967 which attempted to put into words the issues for women in Dutch society. In 1968, she formed the Man Vrouw Maatschappij (Man woman society) as a coalition between men and women to address the inequalities from a liberal position of changing legislation through lobbying.

In 1969, a group calling themselves the "Mad Minas" (Dutch: Dolle Minas) formed with a far more radical position, engaging in public protests to call attention to sexism. Through consciousness-raising sessions, the Minas met and discussed the issues that they faced in their lives and how those could be politicized. Between January 1970 and October 1974 they staged numerous protests, the first of which was lodged against the Nyenrode Business University, which did not allow women to enroll at that time. In 1970, they led a protest in Amsterdam to address anonymous groping. Sitting on parked cars and bikes, the demonstrators whistled at male bypassers. Entering bars they pinched the buttocks of male patrons to emphasize their objectification. Other actions in which they participated included protests for day care centers, reproductive rights and women's toilets in public spaces. After 1972, most of the Minas protests were focused on the issue of legalized abortion and their most successful campaign was called Baas in eigen Buik (Boss of your Belly), which argued for women's right to govern their own decisions regarding their bodies.

In 1971, a group known as Purple September formed along the lines of liberationist lesbians in the United States. Their name derived from Betty Friedan's reference to lesbians as the "Lavender Menace" and they operated as a separatist group, believing that all women were lesbian and should not bed their oppressers. Rather than reforming the existing society with its hierarchical structure giving men priority, they called for the creation of separate societies for women to evaluate their marginal positions in the family and society as well as the politicization of personal issues. These ideas were characterized by Dutch media much as they were in other places and women who advocated for separatism were seen as being anti-male. After 1974, the liberationist groups in the Netherlands gave way to action groups and liberal feminist groups aimed at legal change, as they believed that thought had significantly changed and political action was necessary.

== Portugal ==
The Women's Liberation Movement came to Portugal via the "trial of the three Marias"—Maria Teresa Horta, Maria Isabel Barreno and Maria Velho da Costa. In 1972, Horta, Barreno and Velho da Costa published Novas Cartas Portuguesas (New Portuguese Letters), a critique of the repression imposed by the Portuguese state since the advent of the New State, specifically upon women under the arbitrary and patriarchal governing systems. The authors were arrested shortly after the book's printing and charged with violating public moral codes and publishing censorship laws. When the book was banned by censors of the Caetano regime, the Marias smuggled copies of the book to France. Sending copies with a cover letter in French to Simone de Beauvoir, Marguerite Duras, and Christiane Rochefort, they called on international feminists for help. Feminists rallied to their support using the book as a feminist icon for the unity of sistership, hosting demonstrations of support in Belgium, England, France, Germany and Sweden, as well as in major cities in the United States like Boston, Houston, Los Angeles, New York City and Washington, D. C. and bringing international pressure to bear on the Portuguese regime. Ironically, Novas Cartas Portuguesas was not translated except in fragments until after the authors' acquittal in 1974. The ban of the book, and subsequently ban on discussing it, or the trial, on the news, meant that within Portugal, it was not read either. Subsequently, it was translated into French (1974), English (1975), German (1976) and Italian (1977).

Two weeks after the Carnation Revolution ousted Marcelo Caetano from power 25 April 1974, the Marias were acquitted. Velho da Costa immediately distanced herself from the book and the feminist movement making a public declaration that the text had not been a feminist treatise, but was written against fascist repression. Barreno refuted Velho da Costa's stance in a public rebuttal. Madalena Barbosa and Horta founded the group Movimento de Libertação das Mulheres (Women's Liberation Movement, MLM) in May 1974, to utilize the momentum created by the trial to improve women's conditions. Support from other international feminists continued with activists from France, Germany and the Netherlands regularly attending meetings and conferences, providing literature, and providing financial support in Portugal. Célia Metrass and Regina Louro were influential members of the group, but as elsewhere, it was formed without hierarchical leadership and met in small groups, where women explored their personal experiences to evaluate commonalities with other women and politicize them. Influenced by the French feminists, small subgroups formed to discuss issues which were of interest to them, including access to employment, restrictions of motherhood, sexuality, among others.

On 13 January 1975, the MLM held a demonstration in Edward VII Park to bring attention to the objectification of women. The press reported that they would be burning bras and there would be a striptease, fueling curiosity as well as disdain for the activists. They were not allowed to burn the veil, mop or flowers, carried by three activists dressed as a bride, a housewife and a sex symbol. In February of that year, the MLM published the Manifesto de Movimento para a Contracepção e Aborto Livre e Gratuito (Manifesto of the Movement for Contraception and Free and Abortion, MCALG), demanding free distribution of contraception and educational materials as well as access to abortion and abolition of laws preventing women from controlling their own reproduction. Horta, Célia Metrass and Helena Sá de Medeiros laid out the position of the MLM in their book Aborto, Direito ao Nosso Corpo (Abortion, Right to Our Body, 1975); abortion was an individual right and not subject to the control by the moral position of the majority.

In April 1975, after a year of meeting in members' homes, the group found a derelict building on Avenida Pedro Álvares Cabral, in Lisbon and took over the space. One of the critical issues was women's right to control their own bodies, and they demanded not only the right to contraception and abortion, but instituted a campaign for sexual education. Unlike other places, the military, specifically those involved with the Movimento das Forças Armadas, who had implemented the coup d'état, worked with the MLM on issues of family violence, because wartime sexual violence was high at the time. The group continued to work on various women's issues through 1979, though never gaining the same visibility as they had with the park protest. Turning their attentions more toward publishing efforts, at the end of the decade, members founded the Cooperativa Editorial de Mujeres (Women's Editorial Cooperative, 1977) and later the Cooperativa Informação, Documentação, Mulher (Cooperative Information, Documentation, Women, 1979). They believed that the time for organizing in the street had passed and that the focus should move toward analysis and creating discourse on the issues.

== Scandinavia ==
The development of the second wave of women's movements in Scandinavia continued the interest in improved conditions for women which had begun in Denmark in 1871 with the Danish Women's Society (Dansk Kvindesamfund). In contrast to the United States where many organizations were disbanded after the right to vote had been achieved, work in the Scandinavian countries had continued without interruption. Renewed interest in gender and equality emerged in the 1960s as individuals such as Elsa Gress, Åse Gruda Skard and Alva Myrdal promoted debate and commissions on the status of women were formed. In particular the Redstockings (Rødstrømpebevægelsen) in Denmark and the New Feminists (Nyfeministene) in Norway reflected most of the trends emerging in the United States and elsewhere in Europe. As elsewhere, the movement was open to all women. Men were typically discouraged from participation to allow women to develop their agenda on their own terms. Organizations were decentralized and non-hierarchical, focused on societal change rather than reform for rights, and relied on consciousness-raising to help women politicize their issues. Though influenced by leftist politics, liberationists were resistant to any political order which ignored women entirely or relegated their issues to the sidelines. (Note: The radical movement in Finland was not a liberationist movement. Beginning in 1965, newspapers published information about gender roles. Born out of the Finnish student movement and the peace movement, Sadankomitea, women formed Association 9. The organization, which included both men and women, sought equal status with men in all things that women "were allowed to do". Defining women by societal perceptions of them, the association pushed boundaries by requiring equal obligations, opportunity and rights, through gender role activism.)

=== Denmark ===
In Denmark, the Women's Liberation Movement had its roots in the 1960s when large numbers of women began to enter the labour market, requiring services such as child care and improved health care. Supported by the Danish Women's Society, the Red Stocking Movement was established in 1970. It fought in particular for equal pay for men and women and for better treatment of women in the workplace, with one of its first public protests being a sit-in on public buses in Copenhagen in May 1970. To demonstrate the variance in women's and men's wages, activists insisted that their fare should be 20% less than that charged to men, as that was the pay gap on their wages. Among many public protests liberationists demonstrated at beauty pageants and walked through the streets, costumed in outlandish, suggestive clothing, to agitate against being treated as sexual objects. The following year, Redstockings hosted an all-women summer camp, allowing only male children, if they were under age thirteen. The success of the camp led to experiments in communal living and women's homes, as well as a feminist festival, hosted in 1974.

The first three to four years of the liberationist movement saw many new issues raised for public debate, including matters previously considered private family concerns like abortion, child care, distribution of domestic chores, incest, and sexual violence, among others. Liberationists were successful in their demands concerning abortion in Denmark, as the law which previously gave limited access, changed in 1973 granting free service on demand with paid sick leave. In 1972, members protested and women campaigned against entry into the European Community, fearing that harmonization of Europe might deteriorate their rights. Danish liberationists preferred to work autonomously and did not integrate with traditional political parties. They focused their demonstrations toward women, society in general and workers and away from governmental lobbying efforts. From the mid-1970s, when state initiatives, such as the Equal Status Council formed in 1975 to address socio-economic inequality, direct actions by the liberationists ceased.

=== Iceland ===
The Women's Liberation Movement in Iceland was inspired by the Danish and Dutch Redstocking movement and began in 1968, when the first meeting was held. Launching a journal Forvitin rauð (Red and curious), the Redstockings explored controversial topics such as abortion, inequality, oppression and the role of women in society. Media portrayed women affiliated with the Redstockings as unkempt and unfeminine man-haters. Demonstrations of women wearing red stockings took place on 1 May 1970, as part of the Labour Day activities. While the majority of women supported socialist class struggle, a small group broke off from the Redstockings joining the more politically neutral Women's Rights Organization (Kvénrettindafélag).

In 1975, Redstockings proposed a women's strike and participated with other women's groups in organizing a massive demonstration known as Women's Day Off. Ninety percent of the women in Iceland struck on 24 October 1975 to demonstrate how vital their participation was in society. Working women refused to work and home makers left child care and domestic chores to their male partners to attended the protest. Men juggled the demands that women typically had to deal with trying to work, while attending to children. Without workers, businesses and schools were forced to close and fathers without day care facilities had to take their children to their work places. The event made worldwide headlines and spurred the government to pass a law guaranteeing that men and women had equality the following year. As elsewhere, liberationists declined by the end of the decade as their values became mainstream and reforms changed the society.

=== Norway ===
Norwegian women began reading literature on the Women's Liberation Movement when Myten om kvinnen, the translation of Betty Friedan's The Feminine Mystique was published in 1968 and was widely read. When American liberationist Jo Freeman visited Oslo in 1970, Norwegian women became interested in new ways to approach addressing women's policy. Inspired by activities in Denmark and Britain, the New Feminists (Nyfeministene) emerged that same year with action groups in Oslo, Bergen and other large cities, as women began to search for an identity outside their homes and sought personal development. In the quest to identify for themselves who or what they wanted to be, women in the liberationist movement rejected the notion that equality could be attained in a society in which they were dependent upon men and challenged societal gender roles. Uninterested in analysis and reform, they believed that the perception of women could be changed through direct action, which made the public aware of issues such as a woman's control of her own body, the need for day care, the objectification of women, and a working environment which offered equal opportunity, pay and working conditions.

Members of New Feminists were leftist, but mostly apolitical and rejected hierarchical organizational structures, this brought them into conflict with groups such as the Women's Front (Kvinnefronten) founded in 1972, which called for a specific socialist policy for women, verging on Communism. New Feminists believed that the similarities in women's lives because of their bodies, their responsibility for family, and even their sexual experience, bound women into a sisterhood which could not be addressed by traditional class-based activism or structures which had fixed goals. Women's autonomy and gaining their own awareness through consciousness-raising were critical, as liberationists believed that changing oneself and society depended on active evaluation of ones' experiences. Leadership had no special value, as leaders' experiences were not more or less true than other women's experiences. Subgroups quickly spread throughout Norway but monthly joint meetings were held in Oslo.

In 1972, with the release of Esther Vilar's book The Manipulated Man, Nina Karin Monsen led a group of activists to protest at the publishing house Aschehoug. Their concern was that since Friedan had been translated, no feminist texts had been released, but Vilar's anti-feminist book was published. The pressure caused the publisher to release a Norwegian translation of the Swedish title Frihet, jämlikhet och systerskap (Freedom, Equality and Sisterhood) by Maud Hägg and Barbro Werkmäster in 1973. That same year, during demonstrations held on International Women's Day, New Feminists were kicked out of the march in Oslo by members of the Women's Front. Undeterred, the liberationists went to a nearby basement and created banners bearing slogans like No for forced labor, No forced births, I am the prime minister to spread their message. In January 1973, when members of the New Feminists were refused service at the pub Sofus on Klingenberggata by managers claiming they were trying to keep prostitutes from their premises, they staged two sit-ins in the establishment. Bringing attention to the unequal treatment by the bar for men and women and showing solidarity with the sex workers, the liberationists forced the bar to close and reopen with a different policy.

New Feminists founded a journal, Sirene in 1973 with the aim of uniting various liberationist groups and disseminating information. The journal's attack on housewives was an effort to win women to the cause, as liberationists used the discontent and unhappiness many women felt with the "housewife/breadwinner system" to fuel the idea that being an unpaid or underpaid laborer led to invisibility and frustration, but the stance caused controversy. That same year the liberationists held a national committee meeting in Sandnes for the 200 autonomous organizations throughout the country. The national committee established its own journal, Feministen and published the common goals of various groups, but did not serve as an executive board or direct the local groups. 1973 also marked the year, liberationists began to publicly support lesbian liberation, though in 1974, to address their different needs Lesbisk bevegelse (Lesbian Movement) was founded by former New Feminist members.

Abortion as part of a woman's right to control her body had been a major part of the New Feminists activism since their founding. In 1975, when the Norwegian parliament was debating the issue, New Feminists, hiding slogan placards under their coats, asked for a tour, entered the chamber, and protested, demanding unrestricted access to abortion as well as no coercion on the subject. Removal by the police did not prevent further action, such as when the following year liberationists ringed the exterior of the Storting building singing songs and carrying banners in peaceful protest. Police were again called to break up the protest. In 1975, during the annual women's meeting in Oslo, the group, Brød og Roser (Bread and Roses) came together from activists who left Women's Front because of its close alignment with the Communist Party (Norwegian: Arbeidernes Kommunistparti, AKP). They officially formed in March 1976 under the theme that whatever the root cause of women's oppression, they were united in their need for bread (economic liberation) and roses (sisterhood and love). Combining both a class-based and sexist based theory, but acknowledging that some of their members were not socialists, Bread and Roses had subgroups throughout the country.

In 1977 liberationists returned to the objectification of women and worked with other feminist organizations in the fight against pornography. Creating a traveling exhibition, they protested the consumption of women, which they saw as a catalyst for sexual violence against women. That same year New Feminists in Oslo began the first domestic violence hot line and the following year opened the first emergency women's shelter. Quickly hotlines and shelters became scattered across Norway, as did negative press characterizing activists working against sexual violence as man-haters. Interest in feminism nevertheless spread with the support of other women's organizations in the country leading to activism in the universities and in sports.

On 8 March 1978, some 20,000 women demonstrated for improved rights. Ironically, at the height of their influence, radical groups were splintering. The 1978 march was actually two marches, one led by the Women's Front, the Norwegian Women's Association (Norwegian: Norsk Kvinneforbund), the Oslo Women's Legal Rights Association (Norwegian: Oslo Kvinnesaksforening), and various communist groups, which began at Youngstorget. The other led by the Oslo Women's Equal Rights Association, gathered at Fridjof Nansen's Place before starting their march. Members of Bread and Roses, the Lesbian Movement and New Feminists, marched in each protest. In December, 1978, an abortion reform bill was passed which did not meet liberationists demands but rather required women to be advised before making a choice up to the 12th week of pregnancy. After that time, the decision was to be made by a committee. Sirene published its final issue in 1983.

=== Sweden ===
In 1968, Karin Westman Berg began giving a series of lectures on women's history at Uppsala University in a newly developed class on gender. Two of her students, Birgitta Bolinder and Birgitta Svanberg, who were working teachers attended Berg's night classes. Deciding to form a discussion group, eight of the students founded Grupp 8 (Group 8) to evaluate the gender and class struggle. The study group operated for two years, but Gunilla Thorgren felt they needed to become more active. In 1970, Grupp 8 opened to new members, attracting around 100 interested women at their first meeting in Stockholm and soon spread throughout Sweden. That same year women in Lund, established Kvinnoligan (Women's League), after a member brought the book Sisterhood is Powerful home after a visit to the United States. Both groups were formed from women who had come out of male-dominated leftist organizations where women's roles were marginalized and they shunned hierarchical organization, relying on discussion groups for women to increase their awareness through consciousness-raising.

Leading up to the 1970 elections, members of Grupp 8 protested at the Swedish Social Democratic Party (SAP) rally outside the Parliament building. Rolling out banners with slogans, Iréne Matthis took the microphone to ask why women were forced to work as part-time employees and thus were ineligible for pensions. Members of the Swedish Trade Union Confederation forced the activists away, threatening them with their fists. That same year two members, Maud Hägg and Barbro Werkmäster published Frihet, jämlikhet och systerskap (Freedom, Equality and Sisterhood). In February 1971, the Studentafton at Lund University scheduled a meeting which was later called The Women's Camp inviting liberationists from Denmark, the United Kingdom and members from Grupp 8. Over 1,000 women and men participated in the event, the first women's meeting held in the era in Sweden, which prompted a surge of growth in Kvinnoligan, with branches forming in Malmö. Around the same time, Grupp 8 founded a journal Kvinnobulletinen (Women's Bulletin), outlining their aims and began publishing on a variety of issues such as employment reforms, free childcare centers, unrestricted access to abortion, and the objectification of women. Initial articles were written from a Marxist perspective, emphasizing the needs of working-class women, but by 1972, these had been replaced with feminist articles addressing such issues as pornography and prostitution.

Both groups addressed issues through direct action, using demonstrations, heckling, street theatre performances, and art exhibitions, such as a demonstration held on 8 March 1971, by ten members of Grupp 8 who protested for daycare centers and unrestricted abortion in Stockholm. The following year, working with members of the Swedish Women's Left-wing Association (Swedish: Svenska Kvinnors Vänsterförbund), liberationists organized the first public participation in what would become an annual International Women's Day event. A month later, on 8 April 1972, Grupp 8 hosted an exhibition "Women" at the Moderna Museet which featured various aspects of women's lives, including intimate details, like menstruation. 13,000 people visited the installation within a month, spurred by media reports which not only analyzed the exhibit, but ridiculed the liberationists as well, characterizing them as "ugly and sexually frustrated". That same year the SAP added initiatives to their platform to address women's issues, over the protests of Grupp 8, which believed that the patriarchal state was hijacking the movement.

In 1973, members of the Grupp 8 in Gothenburg broke away from the organization and formed a group called Nyfeministerna (The New Feminists), as they felt the Grupp 8 branch lacked focus on feminist issues and women's solidarity. Simultaneously, a group of members left the Stockholm branch of Grupp 8 and formed Arbetets kvinnor (Women Workers), accusing their chapter of being too feminist and not focusing enough on class struggle. Grupp 8 nevertheless continued to be the main organization in Sweden advocating for women. Lesbian women were active in Grupp 8, and after 1974, in the Lesbian Front, which formed in that year. In 1975, inspired by Susan Brownmiller's Against Our Will, Maria-Pia Boëthius began a series of articles in the newspaper Expressen to bring the discussion of rape into the public sphere. The following year, she published Skylla sig själv (Self-blame) analyzing victim blaming by the male-dominated legal system.

In 1976, the Sexualbrottsutredningen (Sexual Crimes Investigation), which had been commissioned by the government in 1971 was published. The investigating committee, composed of eight men over the age of 60 and one woman, produced an analysis which recommended that penalties for sexual violence be minimized, that victim's behavior mitigate the severity of the crime, and that age requirements concerning sexual acts involving children be lowered, in the case of sexual touching to as low as ten years-of-age. Grupp 8 immediately came out against the recommendations and encouraged other activists to follow their lead. Organizing around 500,000 women, from thirteen women's groups, the liberationists prepared a joint statement criticizing the report. The press surrounding the outcry raised awareness on the issue, forcing the government to abandon the plan to revise statutes.

The Kvinnofronten (Women's Front) was formed in 1977, when a large portion of the membership of Grupp 8 left over what they saw as insufficient attention to the opposition to pornography. Those who joined Kvinnofronten branched across Sweden with focus on eliminating the objectification of women, providing free childcare, and a 6-hour work day. By 1978, participation in events was declining. There were only 2,000 participants in 8 March events that year, and by the early 1980s, the liberationist movement had given way.

== Spain ==
The first liberationist group to form in Barcelona began in 1970, when María José Ragué returned from an extended stay in the United States and invited women to meet in her home to discuss Women's Liberation. A similar group was formed in the home of Laura Tremosa in 1975. The women held consciousness-raising sessions in clandestine meetings which were forbidden by Franco's regime. Underground meetings were also held in the Basque Country as early as 1974. Many feminist activists were also anti-Francoist activists and though they were politically left-leaning, none of the leftist parties had women's agendas nor policies which allowed for women's participation.

The day after Franco's death, Tremosa, along with Mireia Bofil, Amparo Moreno, and Núria Pompeia, among others founded on 21 November 1975 the Asociación de Comunicación Humana y Ecología (Association for Human Communication and Ecology, ANCHE). The name was specifically chosen not to alarm authorities, but their stated goals were to create an autonomous women's liberation group. Liberationists in general sought to redefine women's identity in Spain. A slogan "sexuality is not maternity" became popular at the beginning of the movement and women pressed for the right to have access to contraception and abortion.

In December 1975, the Communist Party provided support for a clandestine meeting of some 400 women in Madrid, who participated in the Pimeras Journadas Nacionales por la Liberación de la Mujer (First National Conference for the Liberation of Women). The conference spawned the creation of the Women's Liberation Front (Spanish: Frente de Liberación de la Mujer (FLM)), which soon had 200 subgroups around the country. Members of the FLM included Celia Amorós, Elena Arnedo and Gloria Nielfa. In 1976 the Jornades Catalanes de la Dona (Catalan Conference on Women) was held at the University of Barcelona with 4,000 attendees. At the conference, ideas about women's sexuality, including the individual rights of women regarding their own bodies were introduced. Soon after the conference, Lidia Falcón founded the Colectivo Feminista de Barcelona (Feminist Collective of Barcelona) and with Carmen Alcalde, began publishing the journal, Vindicación feminist (Feminist Vindication).

The arrest of eleven women regarding abortion in the Basque town of Basauri in September 1976, mobilized women throughout the country to demand control of their own reproductive rights, and led to the first demonstration held in Madrid since 1936. That same year, the Colectivo Feminista Lanbroa (Lanbroa Feminist Collective) was formed in Bilbao by María José Urruzola. The group's main concerns were elimination of patriarchy in educational, health, judicial and political systems, with a focus on the right to divorce and control their own reproduction. In Galicia, the Colectivo grupo Terra (Collective Group Terra) was formed by members seeking liberationist ideals. In 1977, feminists in the Basque Country held the I Journadas de la Mujer de Euskadi (First Conference of Basque Women) in Bilbao, identifying two main threads of feminism—those who saw women's oppression as rooted in sexism and the political feminists who wanted legal reform. That same year in Mallorca, the Colectivo Feminista Pelvis (Pelvis Feminist Collective) was organized.

In 1978, the law restricting contraception was stricken, which was seen as a victory by liberationists. In 1979, a joint protest with members of the Colectivo Feminista Pelvis, Grup per l'Alliberament de la Dona (Group for Women's Liberation) and Mujeres Independientes (Independent Women) was staged in Mallorca with demonstrators carrying funerary wreaths. The action brought attention to the recent deaths of three young women from sexual violence, calling for an end to sexual abuse and a judicial system which allowed men to use alcohol or passion as mitigating factors for their behaviors. The liberationist element of Spanish feminism was always the smallest sector, and the 1970s drew to a close, many of the women who had been involved in the Women's Liberation Movement began transitioning into organizations which were political.

== Switzerland ==
The Women's Liberation Movement in Switzerland (Frauenbefreiungsbewegung (FBB)) was formed in 1969 following student protests the previous year in Zürich. FBB groups sprang up in Basel, Bellinzona, Bern, Geneva, Lausanne, and Locarno. The group became loosely affiliated with similar organizations like the Mouvement pour la Libération de la femme (MLF) in French-speaking cities in the country and the Movimento Femminista Ticinese (MFT) in the Canton of Ticino, an Italian-speaking area. Women affiliated with the movement challenged patriarchy, the position of women in society and the double moral standard imposed upon women. Calling for free abortion and contraception as well as day care centers, membership expanded rapidly. Women's liberation groups in Switzerland were distinguished from other feminist activists by their focus on women's rights to control their own bodies and sexuality, as well as their direct actions aimed at provoking the public and making society aware of the issues faced by women.

The groups took to the street, protesting and engaging in public controversies to bring attention to discrepancies between men's and women's lives, like the inability of women to vote, an education system which made housekeeping courses mandatory for women, and a ban on women's participating in the country's defense. Their first public action was a protest against objectification, but they also demonstrated for equal pay, revision of the marriage laws, retraining of housewives to enter the work force, and improved social benefits for women. As early as 1970, the FBB in Zürich began organizing an experimental kindergarten and unlike in other places, established a formal board. In 1971, the FBB and Progressive Women of Basel organized a petition drive to collect signatures to remove the criminal status from abortion.

By 1972, the FBB-Zürich opened the first women's center in Switzerland, Information Center for Women (German: Informationsstelle für Frauen (INFRA)). The idea for the center was proposed by a consciousness-raising group which discussed sexuality and enlightenment and the center offered counseling on abortion, contraceptives, as well as giving general information on education, alternative medicine, and legal issues. In 1974, a lesbian organization known as the Homosexuelle Frauengruppe (HFG) took space in the INFRA building and affiliated with many of the goals and projects of the FBB. The HFG published a journal and founded a women's bookshop, before formally merging with the FBB in 1980. During the 1975 conference held for International Women's Year taking place in Bern, members of the FBB held a counter-conference to include issues that progressives omitted, like abortion, homosexuality, women prisoners and immigrants.

FBB members were more radical than the conservative members of reformist feminist groups which emerged in their wake. In 1977, some adherents split off to join with socialist feminists. Increasingly FBB groups focused on violence against women and provided counseling services to abused women. The Zürich FBB dissolved in 1989.

== United Kingdom ==
The Women's Liberation Movement in the UK was spurred on by events within the nation, and globally, which forced women to think in different ways about their political lives. In 1968, women machinists organised the Dagenham Ford Plant strike over pay inequality, while women in Hull organised action over local fishermen's safety. These events led to a desire for women throughout the nation to organize.

Student activists in France and the UK were involved in protests over Apartheid and the Vietnam War, radicalizing them, but many women who joined leftist movement felt relegated to the sidelines. Advertising for members to form local consciousness-raising groups, women brought other women to the movement and it grew rapidly. The first National Women's Liberation Movement Conference, attended by around 600 women took place in Britain, for three days, from 27 February 1970, at Ruskin College. Using U.S. Redstocking activist, Kathie Sarachild's articles as a guide, women learned how to analyze issues impacting their own lives and question whether those challenges were broadly effecting other women, giving each woman a personal stake in the outcome of the movement.

In Scotland, student movements and wider regional and national networks were important in establishing women's liberation campaigns. The first Women's Liberation conference in Scotland was held in Glasgow in 1972 and thereafter occurred annually until 1976, when it became a twice yearly event.I n 1972, activists in Edinburgh established a women's shelter to accommodate women and children. Women's studies courses began in Aberdeen and Edinburgh in 1974 as part of an adult education initiative. Scottish publications included The Tayside Women's Liberation Newsletter began in 1975 and was published by WLM groups from Dundee and St Andrews. The Scottish Women's Liberation Journal began publication in 1977, changing its name to MsPrint the following year originated in Dundee and was printed by Aberdeen People's Press. Nessie, published in St Andrews, was begun in 1979.

The Greenham Common Peace Camp started in 1981. A group of women protesting nuclear missiles marched from Cardiff, Wales, to the RAF Greenham. Women left their jobs and families in order to occupy the space and fight for peace in a direct action which recognized that men were responsible for most of the world's violence. Unaligned with political groups, the women gained wide support from the media and public for their stance to non-violence. Helen John was one of the founders of the occupation.

In Northern Ireland, the idea of Women's Liberation was often bound to the Nationalist Troubles of the era. The Northern Ireland Women's Rights Movement (NIWRM), formed in 1975, tried to achieve neutrality by focusing on employment rights and sexism. Difficulties in advocating for women's rights when adherence to religious norms on morality and reproduction had become politicized, created a climate where advocates often had to shift focus to maintain an apolitical stance.

Abortion and domestic violence were unifying issue for liberationists throughout the nation, including activism to increase access to contraception. The British Abortion Act of 1967 was passed to eliminate unsupervised primitive and unhygienic procedures and had little to do with women's rights to govern their own bodies. From the emergence of the WLM in Britain activists felt the importance of shifting the debate to self-determination. The Women's Aid Federation of England was founded by liberationists in 1974 to specifically work on the issues of domestic violence. The following year, the National Abortion Campaign (NAC) formed In 1975, the National Abortion Campaign (NAC) was formed to organize the push toward choice.

The first Reclaim the Night march was organised in 1977 to challenge the idea that women should stay inside after dark in order to avoid rape and assault. Reclaim the Night protests spread to Bolton and Brighton and a national march was held in London on 20 January 1979. The Guardian reported in 1979 that the marches had had "little attention except for a few sneers and weak jokes". However, the marches took place in 12 locations in England and involved hundreds of women. Reclaim the Night inspired the Take Back the Night movement in the United States.

In 1977, the British edition of Susan Brownmiller's Against Our Will was published and became an influential text, showing how rape had been weaponized throughout history. In response liberationists throughout the UK worked to shift the focus away from women's behaviour toward the perpetrator. Through establishment of rape crisis centres, they led the effort to provide support to victims and campaigned for change, publishing articles to increase awareness among the public. The first Reclaim the Night march was organised in 1977 to challenge the idea that women should stay inside after dark in order to avoid rape and assault. Reclaim the Night protests spread to Bolton and Brighton and a national march was held in London on 20 January 1979. The Guardian reported in 1979 that the marches had had "little attention except for a few sneers and weak jokes". However, the marches took place in 12 locations in England and involved hundreds of women. Reclaim the Night inspired the Take Back the Night movement in the United States.

Varied ideologies existed in 1970s-1980s feminist activism in the UK. Socialist feminists were prevalent from the beginning of the movement, with Marxist or Maoist feminists believed that the focus should be on class struggle, with recognition that certain systems were biased towards male supremacy. Liberationists argued that socialist feminism failed to recognize the differences in class struggle and women's issues, which were often sidelined by focus on class.

Politically black feminist groups were established to specifically address intersections of race, gender, and class facing their communities, and in response to black and Asian women's issues being marginalised in white feminist spaces. In 1973, black British women organised the Brixton Black Women's Group to focus on education and contraceptive issues in their community. Women who were former British Black Panthers, such as Olive Morris, Beverly Bryan and Liz Obi, were involved in this group. The organisation was the first black women's group in the UK. Morris also helped start other women's groups such as the Manchester Black Women's Co-operative, the Black Women's Mutual Aid Group, The Organisation of Women of Asian and African Descent (OWAAD) and a self-help bookstore, the Sarbarr Bookshop. OWAAD formed in 1978 and in March 1979 sponsored a conference, where around 250 met to talk about the multiple issues they faced based on their gender, race and class. Many of the members were immigrants from various British colonies and were concerned with the impact of immigration laws on their communities. Founding a journal, FOWAAD, with the purpose of keeping women involved connected and informed, one of their first direct actions was a sit-in at Heathrow Airport to protest virginity tests given to women upon entering the UK.

Socialist feminists felt the focus on men as the enemy and the idea of women needing to separate themselves from men, led to misunderstandings and characterizations of feminists as man-haters and lesbians, regardless of their actual sexual orientation. To many, in the period where sexuality had been a taboo topic, lesbians were seen as more "scary than scared". Though the movement was fluid and aimed to incorporate all women, these types of differences often led to group fractures and by the late 1970s, separate conferences were held for socialist feminists and liberationists.

In the late 1970s, revolutionary feminism took off in England, with more militant feminists who were inspired by a workshop and a conference paper at the National Women's Liberation Conference of 1977. Revolutionary liberationists tended to be separatist, adhered to a doctrine of political lesbianism and directed their actions toward pornography, sexual abuse, and sexual violence. They argued that "male violence against women is an expression of male supremacy and political control of women" and conceptualized gender as class, in which all men held the power positions and all women were the exploited class. Increasingly, revolutionary feminists refused to engage with men, even those who engaged in similar social struggles.

In 1979, the Southall Black Sisters formed to address violence against women and address issues within the black and Asian communities. Based on a liberationist model, they offered consciousness-raising discussions, counseling services and information in a multi-lingual format.

By the end of the 1970s the movement had grown so large that it was difficult to sustain the personal and individual aspects which characterized the early movement. Conferences in Britain numbering near 3,000 participants made it difficult for individual activists to have a say in shaping policy or in discussions. Fragmentation on issues which were important to their personal political perspectives, was common for activists in the later part of the movement. In the drive to move from theory to action, liberationists began working on single-issue campaigns to ensure that gains which had been made were not rolled back. In addition, as the state had reformed many policies toward women and political and economic situation had shifted dramatically, activists felt a need to shift the way that they engaged with the state and public.

== See also ==
- Women's liberation movement in Asia
- Women's liberation movement in North America
- Women's liberation movement in Oceania
