= Take Back the Night =

Take Back the Night may refer to:

- Take Back the Night (organization), an anti-violence organization
- "Take Back the Night" (song), a 2013 song by Justin Timberlake
- "Take Back the Night", a 2013 song by TryHardNinja in collaboration with Jordan Maron
- Take Back the Night, a 1980 feminist book edited by Laura Lederer
- Reclaim the Night, a movement against night-time sexual and physical violence and harassment against women
