= Kappa Lambda Psi =

American collegiate sorority

- ΚΛΨ
- Founded: April 28, 1980; 45 years ago Glassboro State College
- Type: Social
- Affiliation: Independent
- Status: Active
- Scope: Local
- Motto: "Kinship, Love, and Pride!"
- Colors: Navy blue and Grey
- Symbol: Candle and Omicron Star
- Flower: Morning glory
- Jewel: Diamond
- Mascot: Lamb
- Philanthropy: Take Back the Night
- Chapters: 1
- Headquarters: 3399 North Road; Poughkeepsie, New York 12601; United States
- Website: Kappa Lambda Psi

Kappa Lambda Psi (ΚΛΨ) is an American collegiate sorority founded in 1980 at Glassboro State College (now Rowan University). It installed five chapters; the Delta chapter at Marist College remains active as a local sorority.

== History ==
Kappa Lambda Psi was established on April 28, 1980, at Glassboro State College by 28 women who had the hopes of creating the 27th national sorority to join the National Panhellenic Conference (NPC).

The sorority became national with the establishment of the Beta chapter at Montclair State University and Gamma at William Paterson University. In 1985, the Beta collected toys and food for a Christmas party as St. Agatha's Home of New York Foundling Hospital. In March 1989, the Alpha chapter spearheaded a campus campaign to raise funds for multiple sclerosis research.

Delta chapter was chartered in October 1989, becoming the first Greek Letter Organization at Marist College in Poughkeepsie, New York. It is the only surviving chapter of Kappa Lambda Psi and now operates as a local sorority.

== Symbols ==
The motto of Kappa Lambda Psi is "Kinship, Love, and Pride!" The sorority's colors are navy blue and grey. Its jewel is the diamond; it was chosen because it was "unique, valued, and cherished" as are the sorority's members. Its flower is the morning glory; it was selected because it opens every morning, symbolizing being open to friendships and new ideas.

The Kappa Lambda Psi mascot is the lamb, which symbolizes purity of heart. The sorority's symbols are the candle and the Omicron star. The Omicron star guides the way through life. The candle symbolizes a burning flame for knowledge.

== Activities ==
Kappa Lambda Psi is one of the organizations responsible for bringing Take Back the Night to the college's campus. Each semester, Kappa Lambda Psi organizes an on-campus blood drive in partnership with Alpha Phi Delta fraternity; the sorority received a plaque from New York Blood Services in appreciation for their work organizing Blood Drives at Marist College.

In 2005, Liberty Partnerships, a nonprofit organization that works with at-risk girls in urban areas, recognized Kappa Lambda Psi members for volunteering with the program. Kappa Lambda Psi was selected as the Club of the Year by Marist College's Student Government Association in 2001 and 2003.

== Philanthropy ==
Kappa Lambda Psi's philanthropy is Take Back the Night. The sorority's past philanthropies include the American Cancer Society and New York Blood Services.

== Chapters ==
Following is a list of Kappa Lambda Psi chapters. Active chapters noted in bold, inactive chapters noted in italics.

Name	Charter date and range	Institution	Location	Status	Ref.
Alpha	April 28, 1980 – 20xx ?	Rowan University	Glassboro, New Jersey	Inactive	(Note: Chapter was formed at Glassboro State College which became Rowan University in 1997.)
Beta	Bef. 1985–19xx ?	Montclair State University	Madison, New Jersey	Inactive	
Gamma	198x ?–19xx ?	William Paterson University	Wayne, New Jersey	Inactive	
**Delta**	October 1989	Marist College	Poughkeepsie, New York	Active	
Epsilon	198x ?–19xx ?	Fairleigh Dickinson University	Teaneck, New Jersey ?	Inactive	
