= Anne Zelensky =

French feminist author and activist (born 1935)

- Born: 24 October 1935 (age 90); Casablanca, Morocco
- Movement: Mouvement de libération des femmes (MLF)
- Spouse: Emmanuelle Escal
- Awards: Legion of Honour

Anne Zelensky (born 24 October 1935) is a French feminist activist and author. She is known for being a prominent figure in the Mouvement de libération des femmes (women’s liberation movement), which took place in 1970 that advocated to consolidate fundamental rights for women in France.

As the daughter of a French colonial official in Côte d'Ivoire, she was exposed at a young age to the existing colonial racism and sexist oppression within the social system. As an adult, Anne Zelensky became a French feminist activist who took part in the revival of French feminism in 1966. She, amongst other things, alongside Jacqueline Feldman, founded the FMA (Féminin Masculin Avenir, Feminine Masculine Future) a mixed-gender activist group that focused on female equality after playing a major role in the Mouvement de libération des femmes (MLF) in 1970.

She was a significant player in the feminist movement during the May 68 civil unrest protests and throughout the 1970s. Zelensky worked closely with author and sociologist Jacqueline Feldman, with whom she co-founded the FMA, along with existentialist philosopher Simone de Beauvoir, the author of The Second Sex. Zelensky is one of the women behind the Manifesto of the 343 in 1971, a call for the decriminalization and legalization of voluntary interruption of pregnancy (IVG), which included medical procedures such as abortion.

In particular, she defended the position that women must gain access to political responsibilities, which was an unpopular opinion at the time in the feminist movement.

== Feminist activism in France ==
The FMA feminist association created a sub-organisation called SOS Femmes Alternative, which opened the first shelter for battered women in France in 1978. Zelensky was president of this organisation from 1980 for several years. She participated in the creation of the association "Hommes et Violences en privé," which opened the first reception and help centre for violent men in France in 1990.

In 1984, she launched an anti-sexist advertisement "Not touched in the image of the man," which appeared in several media outlets and received international support. She organized the first symposium on "Sexual harassment at work" in 1985. With widespread media attention, the symposium saw the last public appearance of Simone de Beauvoir, a place to support the action. As part of her activism, she also participated in the creation of the League of International Women's Rights in 1974 with Annie Sugier, Vicky Colombet and Annie Cohen. The League, led by Simone de Beauvoir, directed its efforts to specific forms of sexism and proposed an anti-sexist bill in 1974, which was adopted by the government in 1983 but was never voted on.

Zelensky was the first woman to host a café-philosophique in 1996 and organized debates with female philosophers. "Café-Philos" were a popular activity for local French residents interested in philosophical discussions. This was founded by the French philosopher Marc Sautet in Paris, France, 13 December 1992.

== Career in Féminin Masculin Avenir (FMA) ==
France along with other western nations saw a trend in the rise of feminism in the 1960s and 1970s. France experienced this force of feminism most dramatically in 1975 with the decriminalization of abortion laws. However, due to the heterogeneity that existed in the understanding of feminism, French feminism was volatile to contradictions and conflicts between different feminist views. In the early 1970s, the Mouvement de Libération des Femmes (MLF) or the Women's Liberation Movement was created with the main objective of mobilizing women's autonomy and lifting them out of organizational structures where they were systemically put in a place of subordination. These kinds of placements were conducted towards women who had no choice of their own. One of the most contested topics within this movement, along with other like-minded organisations, was whether or not men had a part to play in feminism or whether it should be exclusive to women.

Zelensky participated in this gender centric debate by explicitly showing her support for non-separatism within the feminist movement. She focused on holding spaces for all feminist activists instead of trying to solve the defining technicality of who can or can't be a feminist. In 1967 Zelensky founded a mixed-gender feminist organisation named Féminin Masculin Avenir (FMA) that preceded the MLF and included some of her close male friends, Roger Ribes and Charles Cassuto. However, Zelensky's attempt to involve men in the movement of feminism received immense backlash from separatist feminists as well as male-violence and misandry activists. It was a common response received by other non-separatist feminists such as Marie-Victoire Louis. Due to these circumstances, between 1969 and 1970 the FMA became a women-only organisation. Disagreements regarding the role in feminism were not only felt in France but other European countries such as Belgium. When men did contribute to the cause, they were mostly university-educated individuals, some directly involved in organizing feminist demonstrations and some were more in the periphery of women-led organisations.

The FMA as an organisation differed from groups preceding it by taking a more intersectional approach. Instead of focusing on the existence of a hierarchy of oppression amongst race, social class and colonialism, the FMA prioritized the struggles of women as a whole. However, the consequence of this in relation to the FMA's role in inspiring the MLF was the absence of leadership roles of working-class and marginalized women in the MLF. Zelensky believed, based on a life of observations, that the stark difference between her experience in society as a white woman compared with that of her black peers meant the two issues, race and gender, were mutually exclusive battles and must be fought separately. These separations and fractures in activism that succeeded feminism in the late 18th century and that proceeded the 2000s has been identified by historians as a distinguishing trait of second-wave French feminism, a wave which Zelensky was a major influence.

== Later career and criticism ==
Between 2007 and 2014, Zelensky was the editor of the Riposte Laïque, a highly controversial, far-right anti-Muslim website that presented itself as part of the secular and counter-jihad movements under the name of laïcité. Zelensky has been criticized for her vocal stance on the alleged "Islamisation of France" and on Muslim women who wear the hijab. She, along with other prominent feminists in France said that the "Islamic practice [is] unitary and oppressive to women." Zelensky would eventually become a leading figure against Muslim women's rights to wear a hijab. For example, Zelensky believed that the hijab was a symbol of female oppression, writing in Le Monde that it "symbolises women’s place in Islam as it is understood by Islamism. This place is in the shadows, relegated, in submission to men. The fact that women claim it as their decision does nothing to change its meaning . . . There is no surer oppression than self-oppression". (Le Monde, 30 May 2003).

In 2005, she published her autobiography where she looks back on her feminist journey and testifies to the evolution of the feminist movement since 1968.

== Awards and recognition ==
Zelensky was awarded the Legion of Honour in 1998.

== Publications ==
- Anne Zelensky-Tristan, Mémoires d’une féministe (Memoirs of a Feminist), Paris, Calmann-Lévy, 2005, 405 p.
- Histoires d'amour (Love Story), under the pseudonym Anne Tristan, Calmann-Lévy (ed.), 1979.
- Histoires du MLF (History of the French Women's Liberation Movement, MLF), under the pseudonym Anne Tristan, with Annie Sugier (a.k.a. Annie de Pisan), Calmann-Lévy, 1977 (preface by Simone de Beauvoir).
- Ah elle ira, elle ira…à l'Assemblée Nationale (Ah, she will go to the National Assembly), children's drawings on gender parity, Indigo editions and Côté-Femmes 1995 collective.
- Chroniques des petits abus de pouvoirs (Chronicles of Small Abuses of Power), with Régine Dhoquois, L’Harmattan (ed.), 2010.
- Harcèlement sexuel: scandale et réalités (Sexual Harassment: Scandal and Reality), with Mireille Gaussot, Editions du Rocher (ed.), 1985
- Maternité esclave (Enslaved Motherhood) [collection], ed. no. 10–18, 1975
- Partisans année zéro (Supporters Year Zero) [collection], Editions Maspero (ed.), 1970
