= Rimjhim Sinha =

Indian feminist and activist from Kolkata

Rimjhim Sinha (born c. 1995) is an Indian feminist, sociology researcher, and social activist based in Kolkata, West Bengal. She is best known for initiating the “Reclaim the Night” protest movement in response to the 2024 rape and murder of a postgraduate trainee doctor at R.G. Kar Medical College and Hospital. Sinha is also an advocate for women's rights, menstrual health, and education access in urban slums.

== Early life and education ==
Rimjhim Sinha was born and raised in Kolkata, West Bengal. She completed her schooling in the city and pursued sociology at Presidency University, Kolkata. During her college years, she actively participated in street theatre and gender sensitisation workshops. Her experiences in urban Kolkata and academic engagement with feminist theory led her to grassroots activism.

== Activism and career ==
=== Reclaim the Night and the R.G. Kar movement ===
In August 2024, the rape and murder of a young woman doctor at R. G. Kar Medical College and Hospital sparked widespread outrage in Kolkata. In response, Sinha launched the "Reclaim the Night" movement, which became a landmark in Bengal's civil protest history.

Sinha called for a city-wide candlelight protest on the night of 14 August 2024, coinciding with the eve of Indian Independence Day. The slogan "Swadhinotar Modhyoraatey, Nari Swadhinotar Jonyo" ("At the midnight hour of Independence, for women's liberation") became the movement’s defining chant.

Within a week, over 40 neighbourhoods participated in silent marches and torch rallies, drawing students, doctors, artists, homemakers, and working-class people.

Key events during the movement included:

- A 42-km city-wide torch march.
- Sit-ins at college campuses and metro stations.
- A joint protest on 16 January 2025 involving doctors, women's organisations, and LGBTQ+ collectives demanding judicial action, workplace safety reforms, and institutional anti-harassment protocols.

The movement’s apolitical stance faced resistance from multiple quarters. Reports emerged of retaliatory postings and demotions of protesting doctors.

Despite the pushback, the campaign maintained public momentum, with over 1,200 progressive bookstalls and community pandals theming their Durga Puja installations around justice for the victim.

By July 2025, anniversary marches were planned in over 25 locations across Bengal and included the victim’s family.

=== Other activism ===
Rimjhim Sinha is the co-founder of the NGO Udaan Kolkata, which works in urban slums to provide education, menstrual hygiene awareness, and vocational training for women.

== Recognition ==
Sinha's work has been widely covered in national and regional media. She has received:

- Featured in The Week as one of "India’s 50 Women of Influence – 2024 Edition"
- Recognition from UN Women India for leading feminist civil resistance

== Personal life ==
Rimjhim Sinha lives in South Kolkata. She continues her work in urban development, mentoring young activists, and writing on gender justice.

== See also ==
- Women's rights in India
- 2024 Kolkata rape and murder
- Feminism in India
- Reclaim the night
