= Rita Mulier =

Belgian feminist author and economist (1934–2026)

Rita Mulier (20 June 1934 – 20 April 2026) was a Belgian feminist author and economist. Writing for De nieuwe maand (The New Month), she set up the Vrouwen Overleg Komitee (VOK, Women's Consultation Committee) and played a role in the women's liberation movement in Belgium. She focused on mother's rights in the workplace and held a post in the Flemish Community from 1991 until 1996. She was recognised with a baronetcy and published her autobiography in 1999.

== Early life ==
Rita Mulier was born in 1934 in Kortrijk, Flanders, Belgium. She was the eighth of nine children. She survived World War II then studied law and economics at Leuven University, on the insistence of her father who was a political activist. She was the only female editor of the student newspaper, writing about women's issues whilst studying how women in Belgium only had as much rights as children and the mentally disabled. Whilst at university Mulier met her husband, with whom she had six children (one dying in premature birth). She then decided to take the oral contraceptive pill, going against her Catholic upbringing.

== Career ==
Mulier started working at Katholieke Arbeidersvrouwen (KAV – Catholic Female Workers) and published a report entitled De vrouw nu: Een nieuw statuut (Women now: A new status) in 1966, which argued there should be more help for women to re-enter the job market after having children. She next worked at the youth section of the Christelijke Volkspartij (CVP – Catholic Workers Party); she was involved in the 1968 debate over abortion and wrote for various journals about women's rights. She became editor of De nieuwe maand (The New Month) and organized a feminist weekend in 1972; the latter inspired the creation of both the first national women's day on 11 November that year and the Vrouwen Overleg Komitee (VOK, Women's Consultation Committee). Mulier became the first president of VOK from 1973 until 1981 as it pioneered feminism in Belgium, as part of the women's liberation movement in Europe and following the example of Dolle Mina in the Netherlands. She worked with other feminists such as Lily Boeykens, Ireen Daenen, Moniek Darge and Renée van Mechelen, to make the VOK more dynamic and responsive than previously existing organisations such as the KAV.

With the foundation Omschakelen (which grew out of VOK in 1980), she focused directly on women's employment rights after having children. She then became representative for emancipation in the Flemish Community from 1991 until 1996. Her achievements were recognised with a baronetcy in 2002. In 1999, she published a chapter in the book Democratization and Women's Grassroots Movements with Alison Woodward. They evaluated how VOK worked to unite disparate feminist groups in Belgium. The same year, her autobiography Dwars & loyaal: Een getuigenis over veertig jaar engagement (Contrary & Loyal: An account of forty years of activism) was published.

== Death ==
Mulier died 20 April 2026, at the age of 91.

== Selected works ==
- Mulier, Rita (1999). Dwars & loyaal: Een getuigenis over veertig jaar engagement [Contrary & Loyal: An account of forty years of activism]. Leuven: Van Halewyck. ISBN 9056172492.
- Woodward, Alison E.; Mulier, Rita (1999). "Building democratic bridges over Belgian political bastions". In Bystydzienski, Jill M.; Sekhon, Joti (eds.). Democratization and women's grassroots movements. Bloomington: Indiana University Press. ISBN 9780253028143.
- Mechelen, Renée van; Stuckens, Tilly; Mulier, Rita (1974). De vrouw in de kou. Antwerpen: Nederlandsche Boekhandel. ISBN 9789028999831.
