= Jacqueline Feldman =

French sociologist and author (born 1936)

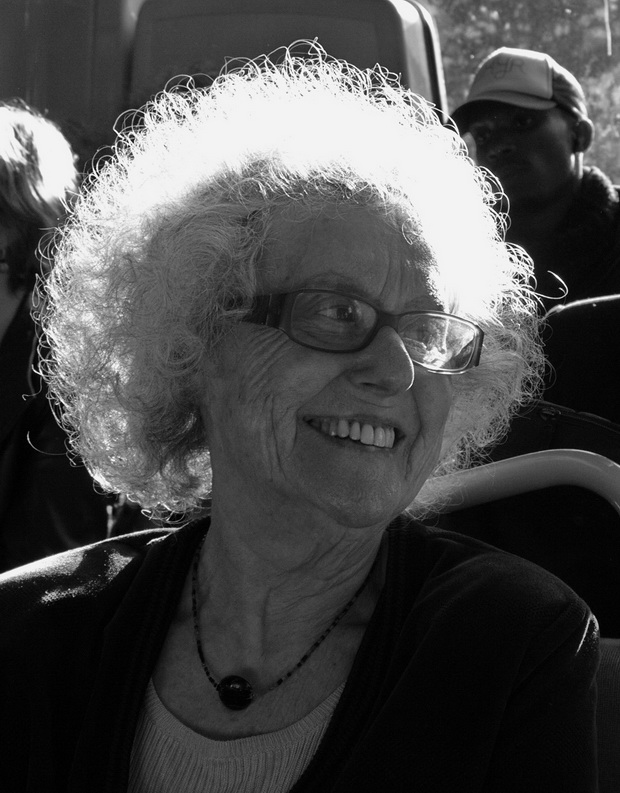
- Feldman in 2012
- Born: August 8, 1936; Paris, France
- Died: June 26, 2026 (aged 89); Hyères, France
- Occupation: Sociologist

Jacqueline Feldman (August 8, 1936 – June 26, 2026) was a French sociologist and author. She worked as a researcher for the French National Centre for Scientific Research until retirement in 2001, but has continued to publish until 2020. She co-founded FMA (Féminin, Masculin, Avenir), one of the ancestors that later would become Mouvement de libération des femmes in 1970.

== Biography ==
=== Early life ===
Jacqueline Feldman was born in Paris of secular Polish Jewish immigrants, her father working as a tailor. Her parents moved to Paris from Łódź at the end of the 1920s . She has an older sister, born in 1932. During the second world war, the family moved from Paris to Noirétable in order to avoid the Nazis. After the war, the family returned to Paris.

=== Early professional career as physicist ===
After getting a job at the CNRS i 1956, she would be sent to the Niels Bohr Institute in Copenhagen where she started a French doctoral PhD in theoretical physics with Ben Roy Mottelson as advisor. She would meet her future husband Hallstein Høgåsen here. In 1961 she published a paper that would later be cited by Mottelson in his Nobel lecture (1975).

The final paper of her French doctoral thesis was published in 1963. She worked as a physicist at Norwegian Institute of Technology (1963–64) and at the CERN (1964–67).

=== Professional career as a sociologist ===
In 1968 she would switch professionally from theoretical physics to sociology. She had always been interested in sociology, an interest that was enhanced by the political events in Paris in 1968. The sociologists at CNRS were in need of people with strong mathematical background, permitting her to work with them.

Witnessing the very different ways of thinking in the hard and soft sciences, she developed epistemological reflections about it. as well as comments on the Sokal affair

She also worked on the taboos of sexuality, feminism, and women in science.

=== FMA ===
In 1967 Feldman and Anne Zelensky founded the FMA. The abbreviation was originally Féminin, Masculin, Avenir (Feminine, Masculine, Future). As one of several groups, FMA would in 1970 becomeMLF. While the other ancestors of the MLF were purely focused on women's rights and emancipation, the FMA originally had members of both genders and had a focus on women and men collaborating for a better society and relationship between genders. It would after the events of May 1968 become a women-only group with the name changed to Féminism, Marxisme, Action (Feminism, Marxism, Action).

At and during the occupation of Sorbonne in May 1968, Feldman and Zelensky would organize women-themed meetings, inviting and having Évelyne Sullerot to one of them.

=== Jewishness ===
After the MLF developed and Feldman could better define herself as a woman in a male-dominated society, she would consider the problem of her non-religious Jewishness, together with other women. She wrote one of the first articles on what is now called Intersectionality.

=== Work as historian ===
==== Critique of science ====
After May 1968, she criticized scientism through articles in the critical review Impascience (1975–1977). All contributions were anonymous, in accordance to ideas of the time: The content was important, not the author. In Impasciences she collaborated with Françoise Laborie and would later publish a biography on Laborie. The book also treats the critique of science by scientists after May 1968.

==== Taboo and sexuality ====
Using the most popular dictionary in France, the Petit Larousse, Feldman shows in the book "La sexualité du Petit Larousse, ou, Le jeu du dictionnaire" the evolution of taboos on sexuality by studying the different versions of the dictionary from it first version in 1905 to 1979.

==== Condorcet and social mathematics ====
She has published work on Condorcet, a French mathematician and philosopher being the first to propose social mathematics .

==== Jews during 2nd world war ====
As a child and at the start of the second world war, her family moved from Paris to the village Noirétable being in the zone libre until 1942 and hence avoided destiny of many Jews in Paris thanks to the village. As a way to show her gratitude, she worked as a witness and historian for Noirétable and the Loire department in central France.

=== Marriage and children ===
Feldman was married in 1961 to physicist Hallstein Høgåsen that she met at the Niels Bohr Institute - they divorced in 1975. They have two children, a boy (born 1962) and a girl (1963).

== Philosophical and/or political views ==
She has always been somewhat involved in trying to change society. In 1960 that was supporting the independence of Algeria, later she was active in the May 68 student movement and the right of women and workers. In 2019, with feminist friends, she launched a call to obtain the right of Assisted suicide.

== Books ==
- La sexualité du Petit Larousse, ou, Le jeu du dictionnaire (1980)
- Voyage mal poli à travers les savoirs et la science (1980)
- Françoise Laborie, 1938-2016 : histoire d'une femme en science (2020)

=== In collaboration with others ===
- Moyenne, milieu, centre : histoires et usages (1991)
- Éthique, épistémologie et sciences de l'homme (1996)
- L'idée de science au XIXe siècle : huit soirées de lecture à la Bibliothèque des amis de l'instruction du IIIe arrondissement (2006)
- Ma vie en vielle et le droit d'en choisir la fin
