= Annie Sugier =

French physician and feminist

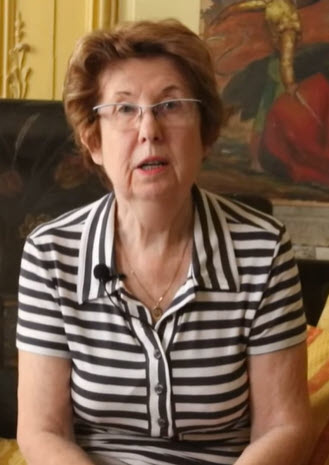
- Annie Sugier in 2017
- Born: February 21, 1942 (age 84); Courcelles-lès-Lens, France
- Education: Faculté des sciences d'Orsay, Université Paris-Saclay
- Occupations: Nuclear Physicist; Feminist Activist
- Political party: PS

Annie Sugier (born 21 February 1942) is a French nuclear physicist and feminist activist. She came to prominence in 1989 as the first woman to be promoted to a directorship at France's "Alternative Energies and Atomic Energy Commission" ("Commissariat à l'énergie atomique et aux énergies alternatives" / CEA). The focus of her responsibilities at the CEA was on the dismantling of nuclear installations.

Sugier has served for many years as president of the "Ligue du droit international des femmes" ("International Women's Rights League"), founded in 1983 by her friend and mentor, Simone de Beauvoir.

== Biography ==
=== Professional ===
Annie Sugier was born in Courcelles-lès-Lens, a small town a short distance to the south of Lille in the extreme north of France. At that time Courcelles was still dominated by its coal mine. Her father worked as a chemical engineer: her mother was a nurse. She received her primary schooling in Argentina and Brazil, returning for her secondary schooling to Europe where she attended schools in Spain and France. She received degrees in Physics and Chemistry at the "Faculté des sciences d'Orsay", part of the Paris-Saclay University.

Sugier then embarked on a career as an industrial chemist, specialising in the reprocessing of radioactive waste, employed as an engineer with the CEA (in a division subsequently reconfigured, and now part of Areva S.A.). She was then appointed to head up the research programmes on the treatment and care of radioactive waste. In 1989 she took charge of the CEA department responsible for the dismantling of nuclear installations, becoming the CEA's first female director. In 1992, she oversaw the integration of the "Institute for Nuclear Protection and Safety" (which at that time was an institute under the umbrella of the CEA, and which later, in 2002, was rebranded and relaunched as the now autonomous "Radioprotection and Nuclear Safety Institute" ("Institut de radioprotection et de sûreté nucléaire" / IRSN). She held the post of "directrice déléguée à la radioprotection" (loosely, "under-director for radioprotection"). This meant that she was responsible for evaluating the scientific data needed for setting radioprotection standards. She also held an advisory role on radioprotection in support of the IRSN director general.

Recognised internationally for her radioprotection expertise, she has held a series of specialist posts connected with the European Commission under the auspices of the "Euratom Article 31 experts", as an expert member of the IAEA radioprotection committee, and as an expert member of the technical committee at the ICRP. Further recognition was reflected in her appointment by Health and Environment Ministers to presidency, in 1997, of the " Groupe Radioécologie Nord-Cotentin" (GRNC). The creation of this interdisciplinary expert group was a first in the world of nuclear sciences. It came in response to scientific disagreement triggered by an epidemiological study postulating a connection between emissions from the La Hague reprocessing plant and a heightened incidence of Leukaemia among young people in the surrounding neighbourhood. Numerous articles by specialists, sociologist and journalists covering related issues of risk management followed. Applying the same model, Sugier then accepted a request by Ministers of Health, Economics and Industry to set up a second interdisciplinary expert group to investigate the old Uranium mines in Limousin (in south-central France), in order to assess their environmental impact.

Within the still resolutely male-dominated Ottawa-based "International Commission on Radiological Protection" (ICRP) she became the first woman to be entrusted with the presidency of one of the technical committees: Committee 4, responsible for regulatory system applications. In this context Sugier took a leading role in producing a new set of ICRP recommendations (Publication 60} and in the drafting of other more specialist publications on emergencies management and land contamination.

She served two terms as a member of the "Scientific Council" at the French parliamentary office for evaluation of scientific and technological choices, of the "Scientific Council" for the Seine-Normandie region and of the influential National Mines Academy. She also served two terms as president of the "Scientific Council" at the "Centre d'étude sur l'évaluation de la protection dans le domaine nucléaire" (study centre for evaluation of nuclear protection) at Fontenay-aux-Roses.

=== Activist ===
During the 1970s Annie Sugier engaged with the women's liberation movement. In 1974/75 she was a co-founder of the "Ligue du droit des femmes" ("Women's rights league"), together with Simone de Beauvoir, Vicky Colombet, Anne Zelensky and Annie Cohen. In 1978, with backing from Simone Veil, Sugier opened the refuge for battered women at Clichy.

The longstanding president of the "International Women's Rights League" ("Ligue du droit international des femmes" / LDIF), she has tackled on the international level the fashion for invoking of "cultural relativism" as a justification for opposing the universal application of women's rights. She has also taken a lead in combatting violence against young girls with immigrant backgrounds: issues on which she has campaigned include excision, forced expatriation and various classes of "honour crime". A particularly high-profile cause célèbre into which she launched herself became identified by slogan-headline "Mères d’Alger" (loosely, "Mothers of Algiers"): A shared colonial history had left several hundred thousand Algerians in France, many of whom came from families that had ended the Algerian War on the "wrong" side. During the 1980s a succession of cases came to the fore in which, following marital ructions, fathers with Algerian connections had removed their children to Algeria, in defiance of French court rulings granting custody of the children in question to their mothers remaining in France. In an effort to provide a remedy for these cases, in August 1986 the governments of France and Algeria signed a convention, (Note: "décret J.O du 19.08.1986") but a view quickly emerged that this had failed to provide an effective remedy. Under Sugier's leadership, the LDIF played a major role in highlighting the issues. A particular atrocity in point was the "Sohane affair", which came up in 2002. (Note: On October 4, 2002 in Vitry-sur-Seine, 17-year-old Sohane Benziane was burned alive in front of her friends in a cellar by her former boyfriend, a local gang leader.) The LDIF received an appeal from the murdered girl's father and sisters that it should join itself as a civil party to the ensuing legal case against the murder suspect and his accomplice, in order "to support the struggle for the memory of Sohane and to ensure that the same thing should not happen in the future to any other person". The trial evidently took some time to prepare, but when it was held, between 31 March and 7 April 2007, the killer and his accomplice were both found guilty. The killer received a 25-year jail sentence while the accomplice was sentenced to 8 years. The accomplice now made the tactical error of lodging an appeal. The LDIF legal team seized the opportunity and lodged their own appeal. The LDIF was represented at the trial by Linda Weil-Curiel, a lawyer with a reputation in the field of women's rights: Sugier and Weil-Curiel had made their important first visit to the dead girl's sister and father together. Throughout the trial Weil-Cureil had emphasized the sexist aspect of the case, and the advocate general clearly took full cognisance of her submissions. The LDIF was represented not in respect of the criminal aspects of the matter but as a civil litigant: on 18 September 2006 the court responsible for the civil aspect of the case accepted that the LDIF intervention was "admissible and well founded". The appeal in respect of the accomplice was heard at the Seine-Saint-Denis Court of Assizes between 8 June and 14 June 2007; a ten-year jail term was substituted for the earlier, lesser sentence. After the verdict, Annie Sugier produced a rapid succession of statements and articles celebrating the fact that for the first time, under pressure from the LIDF's involvement in the case, a court in France had been persuaded to respond to the acts of torture and barbarism of which Sohane Benziane was the victim, to acknowledge the concept of "a sexist crime".

Annie Sugier is a member of the Socialist Party. She regularly contributes to Libération, Le Monde, and the political journal Riposte Laïque. Sugier quit the Riposte editorial team during the summer of 2010, indicating that she no longer found herself in agreement with its tone and political alliances. She formally broke with the Riposte Laïque movement in 2012.

The best known of Annie Sugier's other feminist campaigns involves sport: more specifically the Olympic Games. In 1995 she joined with others to set up the so-called "Atlanta+ Committee", in order to draw attention to and denounce sexual apartheid and discrimination against sportswomen more broadly. In 2012 she published "Femmes voilées aux Jeux olympiques" ("Veiled Women at the Olympic Games") which covered more than twenty years of "Atlanta+ Committee" campaigning. Timed to coincide with the 2012 Summer Olympics, "Londres 2012: Justice pour les femmes" ("London 2012: Justice for the women") was published under her direction and that of Linda Weil-Curiel. That was followed four years later by "Appliquez la Charte olympique" ("Follow the Olympic Charter"), timed to coincide with the 2016 Summer Olympics. The campaigning continues in respect of the 2024 Summer Olympics scheduled for Paris.

Annie Sugier was a jury member for the Simone de Beauvoir Prize for Women's Liberation. She is a member of the "French co-ordination [organisation] for the European Women's Lobby" ("Coordination française pour le lobby européen des femmes"/ CLEF) and of the "Movement for Peace and against Terrorism" ("Mouvement pour la paix et contre le terrorisme" / MPCT). She gave evidence before the 2003 parliamentary enquiry into the contentious issues surrounding the wearing of religious symbols in schools the 2010 enquiry on the wearing if a full veil. Both enquiries were followed by substantive pieces of legislation. She has also testified before senate committees on women's rights, equality of life opportunities between genders and gender equality in sport.

== Celebration and recognition ==
- 1989: Officer of the Ordre national du Mérite
- 2009: Officer of the Légion d’honour
- Knight-Commander of the Ordre national du Mérite
- Pilot's Licence (private aircraft)
