= Vicky Colombet =

American painter

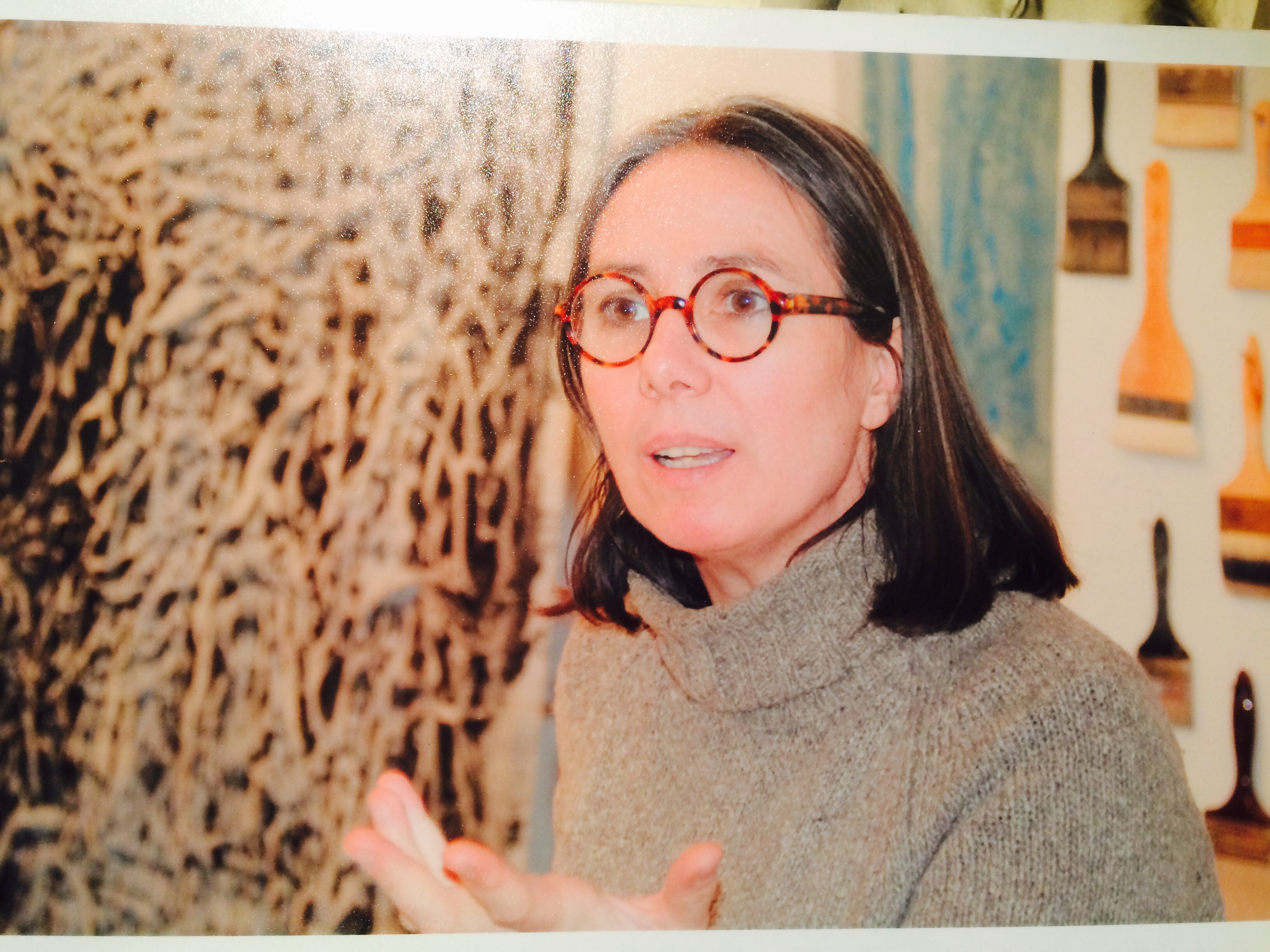
- Born: 1953 (age 72–73); Paris, France
- Known for: Painting
- Style: Abstraction
- Awards: Adolph and Esther Gottlieb Foundation Prize / Pollock-Krasner Foundation Grant.
- Website: vickycolombet.com

Vicky Colombet is a French-born American visual Artist. She lives in New York and Paris.

== Life ==
Born in Paris in 1953, Vicky Colombet grew up in Paris in a family that was artistic and intellectual on her father’s side and nomadic on her mother’s side. Her mother’s search for her ancestry led the family to travel often to Asia. The exposure to Asian Culture at an early age, has been a major influence.

An avid reader of poetry and philosophy Colombet began as a writer and wrote two essays in Les Temps Modernes “Les Femmes s’entêtent" Involved in the Feminist movement in Paris, she met Simone de Beauvoir in 1974 and co-founded with her, and Anne Zelensky, Annie Sugier and Annie Cohen “La Ligue du Droit des Femmes”. Vicky Colombet started a newspaper “Les Nouvelles Féministes” (1974 to 1977) with Simone de Beauvoir as the editor-in-chief. The writer Christiane Rochefort (1917–1998), who became a close friend encouraged her to pursue an artistic career. The painter Henri Dimier (1899–1986), who was an iconoclast with an Asian approach to the practice of art became her mentor. And later, having the opportunity to meet with Agnes Martin in the last years of her life, Colombet was influenced by Martin’s rigor and her withdrawal from the world.

== Work ==
In 2001, Colombet moved to America and became a U.S. citizen in 2013. In many of her paintings and drawings, as well as in her major architectural work the sandblasted curved glass wall of Villa Nurbs, several elements (air, water, earth) merge to manifest the dynamic flux of the universe. "Breathing" is the character Colombet looks for in a work. Colombet never stopped drawing, as a vital exercise of hand and mind and as a record-like notes for the fiction she would unfold on canvas. Each of Colombet's paintings is the result of a long process that starts with the choice of the linen she handpicks in Spain or France. Colombet makes her own primer and grinds her own pigments. "Her paintings… work both as pure abstraction and as studies of nature. They can manage to seem resolutely nonobjective while conveying the weight of a study of mountains or stone. In fact, her philosophy of form can be said to occupy a point where abstraction and nature meet. Colombet’s singular vision juggles the opposition of representation and abstraction. The notable intelligence of her art is, indeed, based upon an objective, nearly scholarly research into the relations between the two. Vicky Colombet extends our knowledge of art’s ability to communicate effects that are inherently mysterious but truly compelling as things to see.”

== Biography ==
Recipient of the Adolph & Esther Gottlieb Foundation award in 2001, the Pollok-Krasner Foundation grant in 2014. Vicky Colombet is a member of the Elizabeth Foundation for the Arts studio program since 2004. Her work has been exhibited extensively on both sides of the Atlantic and is in a number of important private collections in the US and in Europe. Notably, her two first solo shows in the United States were at Haim Chanin Fine Arts in New York and Evo Gallery in Santa Fe, both reviewed in Art in America. From 2005 to 2012, she collaborated with the Spanish architect Enric Ruiz-Geli to create a monumental glass work (150x 12 feet) inside the Villa Nurbs. From 2012 to 2015 she had several group shows at Bernard Jacobson gallery. In 2016 she was in a three-person show at the Museum of Fine Arts at St Petersburg, FL. The Albright-Knox Art Gallery purchased one of her large painting "Antarctica" series the same year. Vicky Colombet is the first Contemporary artist to be included in the Musée Marmottan Monet collection. The Musée Marmottan Monet invited her to have a dialogue with Claude Monet, part of the "Unexpected Dialogues" series - "Painting Like the River, Monet/Colombet". Then "Impression, Soleil Levant" Monet/Fromanger/Colombet at The Bund One Art Museum with the Musée Marmottan Monet, the Académie des Beaux Arts et le Consulat Général de France à Shanghai. In 2022, the Musée Marmottan Monet, in collaboration with the Museum Barberini celebrates the 150th anniversary of, Impression, soleil levant [Impression, Sunrise] and pays tribute to it through the exhibition “Facing the Sun”, presented in Paris from September 21, 2022 to January 29, 2023. Vicky Colombet is one of the masters featured in this exhibition, in honour of the most illustrious sunrise ever known in art history. Vicky Colombet is represented by Fernberger Gallery in Los Angeles

== Bibliography ==
- "Vicky Colombet's Paintings Transcend Place", Will Fenstermaker, Frieze, 2024
- “Face au Soleil” - “Une matiériste du temps”, Connaissance des Arts, Hors Série nº994, Christophe Averty, September 2022
- "Monet and Vicky Colombet Speak Across Time at the Musée Marmottan Monet", Zoé Chevalier, Observer 2021
- "Vicky Colombet's Vision of Endless Change", John Yau, Hyperallergic 2021
- "Time Travel" at Leonard Hutton Galleries (Master Drawings New York 2017), White Hot Magazine, January 2017
- "Measured Life", Creative Loafing Tampa, 2016
- "Navigating Abstraction" Wall Street International
- "A Philosophy of Form": In Vicky Colombet, Abstraction and Nature Meet on Equal Terms", Jonathan Goodman, artcritical, December 2014
- “Coherent Surface, Radiant Light", at Bernard Jacobson Gallery, Art News, Barbara A. MacAdam, New York September 2012
- Spanish TVE documentary "Continuara" 2012
- "At Home With Town & Country" Sarah Medford, Hearst Books, 2010
- On the Radar: "Vicky Colombet: Terres de Brume / A New Geography at Bleu Acier", Creative Loafing, Franki Weddington, 2009
- “On Not Knowing Where to Stand” / "Mirando, Cayendo, Viajando" (catalogue), Galeria Fidel Balaguer, Barcelona, Spain. Lyle Rexer, April 2007
- "Vicky Colombet at Haim Chanin Fine Arts", artforum.com's "Critics' Picks", T. Nikki Cesare, Sept 2007
- "Art of Conversation", Creative Loafing, Tampa, Megan Voeller, 2006
- "Nothing to see from the ground", Nena Tsouti-Schillinger, 2004
- "Winds", Haim Chanin Fine Arts, 2004
- "Canapé" February 2004 edition CUNY TV » City University Television
- "Abstractions au Carré", Carré Sainte Anne, Montpellier,1997

== Public collections ==
- Museum of Fine Arts, Houston, TX, USA
- Albright-Knox Museum, NY, USA
- Musée Marmottan Monet, Paris, France
- Museum of Fine Arts, St. Petersburg, FL, USA
- Tucson Museum of Art, AZ, USA
