= Hallstein Høgåsen =

Norwegian theoretical physicist

Hallstein Tormod Høgåsen
- Born: August 21, 1937 (age 88); Nord-Fron, Norway
- Occupation: Theoretical physicist

Hallstein Tormod Høgåsen (born 21 August 1937) is a Norwegian theoretical physicist.

He was born in Nord-Fron Municipality, but grew up mostly in the neighboring Vågå Municipality. He finished his secondary education at Vinstra Upper Secondary School in 1955. He took the cand.real. degree at the University of Oslo in 1960 and the dr.techn. degree at the Norwegian Institute of Technology in 1964. He was appointed as a docent at the University of Oslo in 1969 and professor of theoretical physics in 1984. His main field has been elementary particle physics. Høgåsen has been affiliated to many universities and research institutes, among others Niels Bohr Institute in Copenhagen, CERN in Geneva, University of Paris and the State University of New York.

He is a fellow of the Norwegian Academy of Science and Letters since 1975 and the Royal Norwegian Society of Sciences and Letters since 1984. He is also active in the Norwegian Pugwash committee.

He has resided at Vågå, Oslo, Geneva, Paris, Slependen and Korsvoll.
