= Reclaim the Night =

Movement started in Leeds in 1977 as part of the Women's Liberation Movement

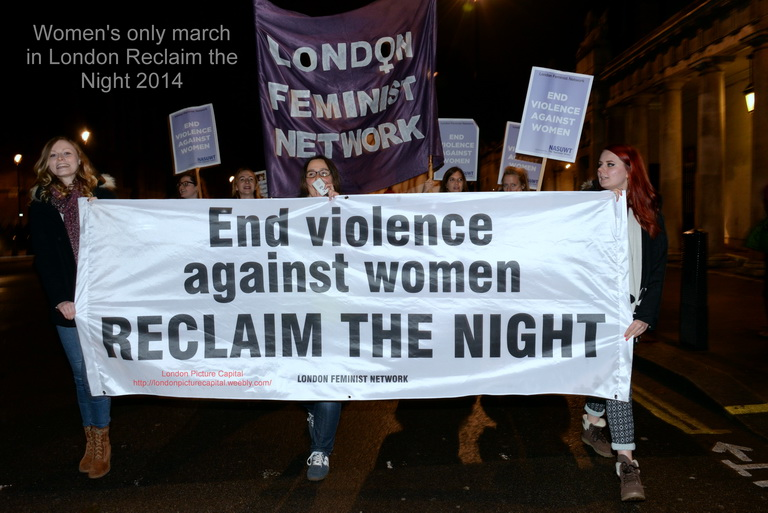
Women march in Central London in November 2014.

Reclaim the Night is a movement started in Leeds in 1977 as part of the Women's Liberation Movement. Marches demanding that women be able to move throughout public spaces at night took place across England until the 1990s. Later, the organisation was revived and sponsors annual and national marches against rape and violence against women.

== History ==
The Reclaim the Night marches were part of the Women's Liberation Movement in England. The inspiration came from marches that had taken place in America in the earlier 70s, such as in Philadelphia, 1975, when Susan 'Sue' Alexander Speeth was murdered walking home from work. Other marches took place following the Leeds march, such as in San Francisco, United States in 1978, following a conference organised by the radical feminist group Women Against Violence and Pornography in Media.

On 30 April 1977 in Germany, synchronised marches took place in several cities, protesting against rape and violence against women. In July 1977, the idea of UK marches was discussed at a conference on Radical Feminism in Edinburgh. Feminists from Leeds were present at the conference and the Leeds Revolutionary Feminist Group organised the first Reclaim the Night marches. One of the co-founders of the 1977 march was Al Garthwaite, who later became a Leeds councillor.

=== Marches in Leeds in 1977 ===
The first Reclaim the Night protests took place in Leeds on 12 November 1977. The marches were in part a response to the "Yorkshire Ripper" murders, and the police response which instructed women to stay out of public spaces after dark. A dozen marches took place that same night in other cities, encouraged by the efforts of women in Leeds. These cities included: York, Bristol, Brighton, Newcastle, Bradford, Manchester, Lancaster and London. In Leeds, the marches started in two locations: one in Chapeltown and one on Woodhouse Moor. The Chapeltown march consisted of approximately 30 women; the Woodhouse march of 85. The marches converged on City Square. Women carried signs such as "No Curfew on Women – Curfew on Men."

== Timeline ==
=== 1978–1979 ===
In October 1978, a march in Soho led to women being injured, and 13 women were arrested after they had a clash with the police. A later march in Soho in January 1979 had 2,000 women attending. Some attendees did not agree with the radical tactics of participants, who were sometimes seen "hissing and swearing at innocent male bystanders" and who shouted "Curfew for Men", "Death to Rapists" and "Castrate Men". Others emphasized the importance of women being able to come together to call out violence and rape, and take back public spaces for themselves.

=== 1980s ===
A Reclaim the Night protest took place in Belfast in 1987. It marched on City Hall and was made up of women from a variety of organisations including Belfast Rape Centre and Stranmillis College.

=== 1990s ===
Eventually, the marches ceased around the 1990s. Al Garthwaite attributed the reduction in activity to two issues: "gradually the original activists started to get jobs and just had less time and there was also a general climate of repression as Thatcherism began to bite".

=== 2000s ===
Women decided to revive the organisation in 2004. That year, only 30 women turned out in London, but in 2005, approximately 1,000 women protested. In 2006, a Reclaim the Night protest was organized in Ipswich in response to the murders of five sex workers, which had between 200 and 300 attendees. The first Reclaim the Night march in Birmingham took place in October 2009.

=== 2010s ===
In November 2010, marches took place in London and Leeds. In London, over 2500 women marched through the city, and the following week more than 200 women protested in Leeds.

The first Reclaim the Night march in Northampton took place in 2013, and allowed both men and women to attend. The march was also meant to raise awareness for the Northamptonshire Rape and Incest Centre (NRICC).

On 25 November 2017, hundreds of women — inspired by the #MeToo movement — marched across the United Kingdom in London, Bristol and Newcastle.

=== 2020s ===
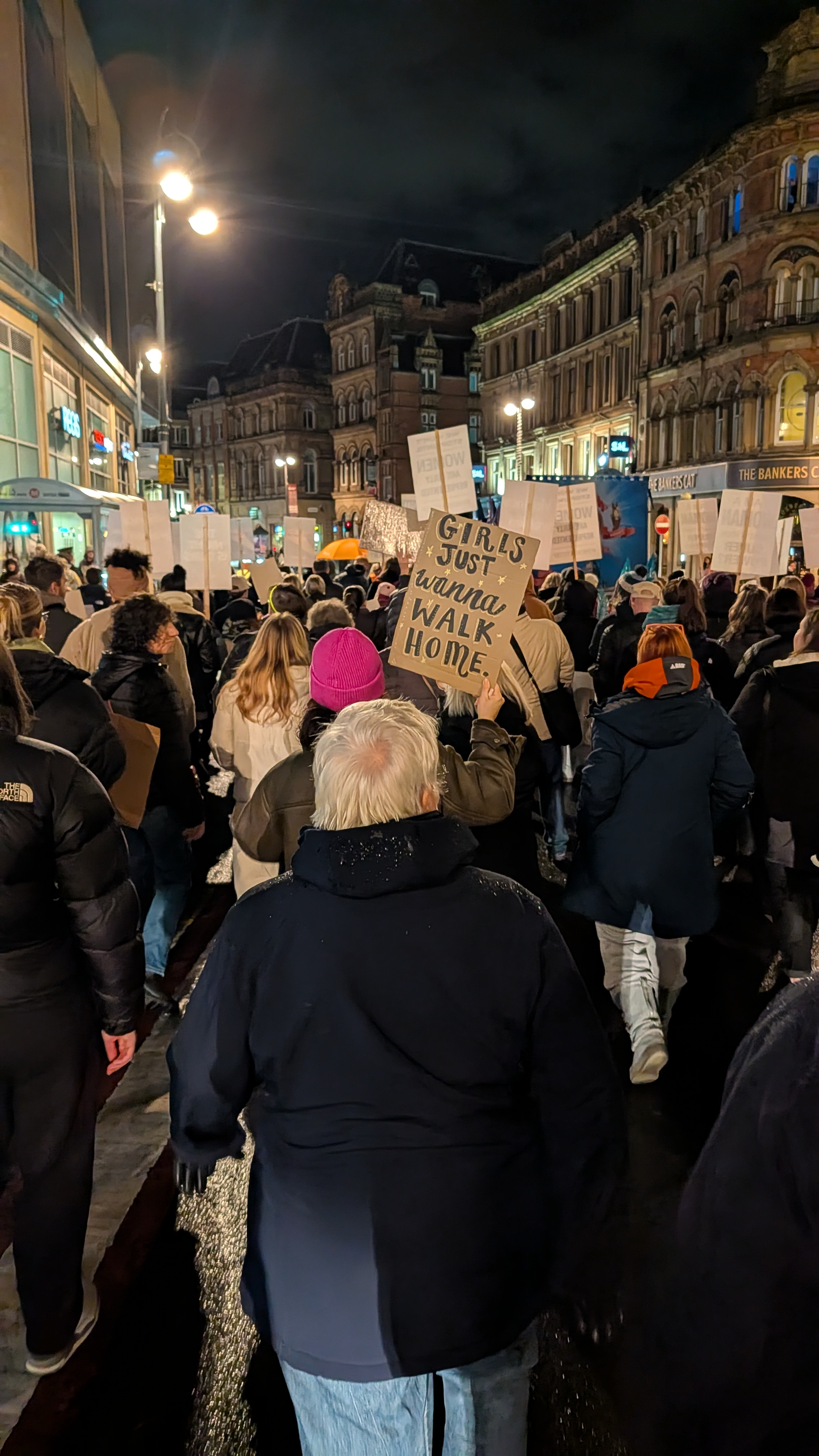
Reclaim the Night march, 25 October 2025

In 2021, Reclaim the Night Leeds tried to stage a vigil in response to the death of Sarah Everard, but this was stopped by police; the protest turned virtual and took place online. Over 28,000 people attended the online event, which was streamed across Facebook, Twitter and Instagram.

== International movement ==
=== Australia ===
In 1978, Reclaim the Night marches were held in the Australia for the first time, first taking place in Perth and Sydney, with Melbourne following in 1979.

=== India ===
Events aimed to "take back the night" took place in India in response to the 2012 Delhi gang rape and murder. In 2017, hundreds of women from twenty Indian cities marched in protest at the mass molestation of women in Bangalore on New Year's Eve. In 2024, thousands of women and men in West Bengal marched for several "Meyera Raat Dokhol Koro" events (the Bengali translation of Reclaim the Night) in protest of the 2024 Kolkata rape and murder incident.

=== Slovenia ===
Noč je naša/Reclaim the Night — Video recording from Slovenia

On 24 November 2017, a Reclaim the Night protest was held in Ljubljiana.

=== USA ===
In 1978, Reclaim the Night marches were held in the US for the first time. 5,000 women from 50 states marched through the red light district of San Francisco.

== Cultural impact ==
The march has inspired a work of theatre called The Darkest Corners, which was part of the Transform 17 festival. The show took place in an outdoor car park on the edge of Leeds' managed red light zone.

== Criticism ==
According to Finn Mackay, accusations of racism were made against Reclaim the Night shortly after the first events in 1977. Claims were made that the original marches "purposely and unthinkingly chose routes through urban areas with a high proportion of Black and Minority Ethnic (BME) communities; demanded increased policing; and made links between Black men and the crime of rape." However, an examination of the first Reclaim the Night protests has found no evidence supporting these claims.

== See also ==
- Crime prevention through environmental design
- Public security
- Security lighting
- SlutWalk
- Take Back the Night
- Sisters Uncut
