= Take Back the Night (organization) =

International non-profit organization

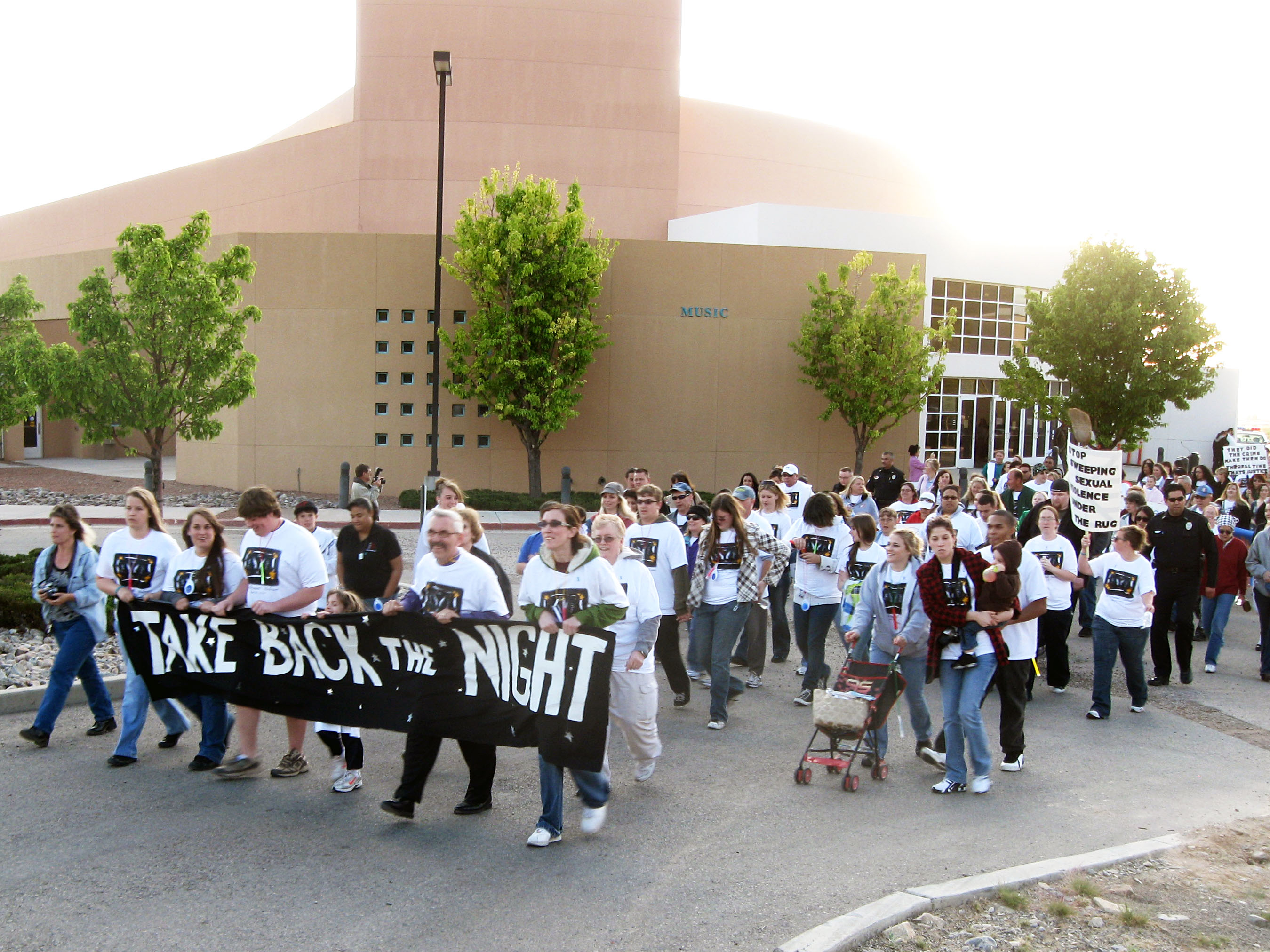
- Take Back the Night march in Alamogordo, New Mexico, April 2010
- Formation: 1970s
- Website: https://takebackthenight.org/

Take Back the Night is an international event and non-profit organization with the mission of ending sexual, relationship, and domestic violence in all forms. Hundreds of events are held in over 30 countries annually. Events often include marches, rallies and vigils intended as a protest and direct action against rape and other forms of sexual, relationship and domestic violence. In 2001, a group of women who had participated in the earliest Take Back the Night marches came together to form the Take Back the Night Foundation in support of the events throughout the United States and the world.

== History ==
Take Back The Night traces back to its roots in the 1970s, when public outrage over violence against women in cities like Philadelphia, San Francisco, and Los Angeles inspired marches, rallies, and protests demanding safety and justice. Early actions included campus demonstrations, opposition to violent pornography, and international advocacy, leading to the widespread adoption of Take Back The Night marches across North America in the 1980s. The movement grew in visibility after tragedies like the 1989 Montreal Massacre and, throughout the 1990s, expanded into diverse events ranging from rallies and concerts to candlelight vigils, helping shape laws, policies, and awareness around victims’ rights. In 2001, the Take Back The Night Foundation (TBTNF) was formally established under the leadership of Katie Koestner, uniting event holders and amplifying survivor voices of all genders. Since then, TBTN has expanded into schools, corporations, sports teams, and global communities, supporting survivors through marches, arts, yoga, a 24/7 legal hotline, and international virtual events. Even through challenges like the COVID-19 pandemic, Take Back The Night has continued to build global partnerships and innovative platforms to empower survivors and advance the movement to end sexual violence worldwide.

== Events ==
Events typically consist of a rally followed by a march and often a speak-out or candlelight vigil on violence against women. Early marches were often deliberately women-only in order to symbolize women's individual walk through darkness and to demonstrate that women united can resist fear and violence. (Most marches in the present day include men; the organization differs as each event is organized locally.) The women-only policies caused controversy on some campuses; activists argued that male allies and sexual assault survivors should be allowed to march in support of women and male victims of sexual violence.

In current practice, Take Back the Night events are not only inclusive of men, but include men as survivors, bystanders, and supporters. Many colleges, such as Wesleyan University in Connecticut, allow men to participate in speaking on their own experiences with sexual assault. Bowdoin College in Maine organizes a similar candlelight vigil and walk that encourages students of all genders to show solidarity for survivors on campus and in this nation. Michigan State University's Take Back the Night event includes a list of demands to the university community to end sexual violence.

While the march began as a way to protest the violence that women experienced while walking in public at night, the purpose of these marches was to speak out against this violence and raise community awareness as a preventive measure against future violence. The mission of Take Back the Night has since grown to encompass all forms of violence against all persons, though sexual violence against women is still the top focus. The word night was originally meant to be taken literally to express the fear that many women feel during the night but has since changed to symbolize a fear of violence in general. This helps the movement incorporate other feminist concerns such as domestic violence and sexual abuse within the home. Take Back the Night events occur on college campuses, in major metropolitan areas, in small towns, on military bases, and even in high schools. International events have been documented in Australia, New Zealand, Japan, Bermuda, Canada, Italy, Poland, Germany, Hungary, India, England and many other countries. The common purpose is to advocate for the right of everyone to feel safe from sexual violence.

Women are often told to be extra careful and take precautions when going out at night. In some parts of the world, even today, women are not allowed out at night. So when women struggle for freedom, we must start at the beginning by fighting for freedom of movement, which we have not had and do not now have. We must recognize that freedom of movement is a precondition for anything else. It comes before freedom of speech in importance because without it freedom of speech cannot in fact exist.

— The Night and Danger by Andrea Dworkin

On November 7, 2009, the first Take the Back the Night annual conference took place at Columbia University.

== Controversy and debate ==
While some Take Back the Night marches encourage men to participate, others still refuse to allow men to be involved under the claim of creating a safe space for women. Several critics have argued that this ignores the struggles of male victims and fails to provide them male role models, as well as implying the need to "take back the night" from all men, not just those who are perpetrators of sexual violence. Advocacy for having a broad coalition of participants including men, women, and transgender individuals alike has come from many different commentators in a variety of publications.

The specific focus of some Take Back the Night events on sexual assaults from strangers and the lack of focus on date rape, child sexual abuse, parental incest, and other such forms of victimization has attracted criticism from a broad group of commentators such as Megan Greenwell of Good Magazine. Greenwell has remarked that the use of the "righteous rape" trope by Take Back the Night participants, to refer to sexual assault in the open by strangers as being somehow inherently morally different to other types of assault, is belittling and wrong.

In the higher-education context, the policy of some institutions to make Take Back the Night events mandatory for students, compelling them to attend regardless of whether they want to or not, has come under criticism by some women's rights activists as being hypocritical and inherently self-defeating. After a 2015 controversy at Virginia Tech emerged in which a mandatory event had some football players in the audience laugh at accounts of sexual assault, try to leave early, and otherwise disrupt the process, 'Womanspace' Co-President Malavika Sahai remarked, "Requiring people to go to an event encroaches on that safe space... [i]f you don't want to be there, you really shouldn't be there."

== See also ==
- Ni Putes Ni Soumises
- Reclaim the Night
- SlutWalk
